This is the complete list of populated places in Serbia without Kosovo, as recorded by 2002 census, in alphabetic order. Places denoted as "urban" (towns and cities) are marked bold. Population for every settlement is given in brackets. The same list, sorted by municipalities, is in List of populated places in Serbia.

A
Ada (10547)
• Adaševci (2166)
• Adorjan (1128)
• Adrani (2198)
• Adrovac (269)
• Adžine Livade (73)
• Akmačići (420)
• Alabana (146)
• Alakince (1503)
• Aldina Reka (12)
• Aldinac (26)
• Aleksa Šantić (2172)
• Aleksandrovac (71)
• Aleksandrovac (588)
• Aleksandrovac (527)
• Aleksandrovac (1546)
• Aleksandrovac (6476)
• Aleksandrovo (393)
• Aleksandrovo (2665)
• Aleksinac (17171)
• Aleksinački Bujmir (557)
• Aleksinački Rudnik (1467)
• Aleksine (66)
• Alibunar (3431)
• Alin Potok (244)
• Aliveroviće (157)
• Aliđerce (1033)
• Aljinovići (196)
• Aljudovo (159)
• Aluloviće (362)
• Amajić (186)
• Amerić (807)
• Amzići (117)
• Apatin (19320)
• Aradac (3461)
• Aranđelovac (24309)
• Arapovac (754)
• Arapoviće (61)
• Arbanasce (568)
• Arbanaška (51)
• Arilje (6744)
• Arnajevo (853)
• Asanovac (65)
• Atenica (619)
• Azanja (4713)
• Azbresnica (853)
• Ašanja  (1488)

B
Ba (605)
• Babajić (493)
• Babe (332)
• Babica (90)
• Babin Kal (51)
• Babin Potok (674)
• Babina Luka (772)
• Babina Poljana (53)
• Babina Poljana (79)
• Babičko (515)
• Babotinac (270)
• Babušnica (4575)
• Bace (284)
• Bacijevce (98)
• Badanj (91)
• Badince (521)
• Badljevica (439)
• Badnjevac (1165)
• Badnjevac (836)
• Badovinci (5406)
• Bagačiće (85)
• Bagrdan (890)
• Bagremovo (204)
• Bajevac (689)
• Bajevica (563)
• Bajina Bašta (9543)
• Bajinci (23)
• Bajmok (8586)
• Bajčetina (29)
• Bajčince (258)
• Bajša (2568)
• Bakionica (742)
• Balajnac (478)
• Balajnac (1236)
• Balanovac (328)
• Balinac (38)
• Balinovac (217)
• Balinovce (154)
• Balinović (160)
• Balići (434)
• Baličevac (1185)
• Baljen (72)
• Baljev Dol (8)
• Baljevac na Ibru (1636)
• Baljevac (532)
• Baljkovac (621)
• Balosave (440)
• Balta Berilovac (187)
• Baluga (434)
• Baluga (733)
• Balčak (26)
• Banatska Dubica (428)
• Banatska Palanka (837)
• Banatska Subotica (200)
• Banatska Topola (1066)
• Banatski Brestovac  (3517)
• Banatski Despotovac (1620)
• Banatski Dvor (1263)
• Banatski Karlovac (5820)
• Banatski Monoštor (135)
• Banatski Sokolac (366)
• Banatsko Aranđelovo (1718)
• Banatsko Karađorđevo (2508)
• Banatsko Novo Selo  (7345)
• Banatsko Veliko Selo (3034)
• Banatsko Višnjićevo (384)
• Bancarevo  (116)
• Baničina (1169)
• Banja (2246)
• Banja (466)
• Banja (2163)
• Banja Koviljača (6340)
• Banjani (1395)
• Banjevac (500)
• Banjica (400)
• Banjski Dol (19)
• Banjski Orešac (96)
• Bankovac (178)
• Bankovci (67)
• Banovo Polje (1619)
• Banoštor (780)
• Bapsko Polje (260)
• Barajevo (8325)
• Baraljevac (316)
• Baranda (1648)
• Barbace (154)
• Barbarušince (86)
• Barbatovac (356)
• Bare (24)
• Bare (390)
• Bare (165)
• Bare (36)
• Bare (923)
• Bare (56)
• Bare (77)
• Bare (71)
• Barelić (161)
• Barice (598)
• Barič (464)
• Barič (6586)
• Barje (7)
• Barje (42)
• Barje (372)
• Barje Čiflik (693)
• Barlovo (166)
• Baroševac (1260)
• Barzilovica (877)
• Basara (8)
• Bastav (585)
• Batalage (501)
• Batinac (871)
• Batkovići (153)
• Batnjik (58)
• Batote (498)
• Batovac (596)
• Batočina (5574)
• Batrage (121)
• Batrovci (320)
• Batulovce (806)
• Batuse (426)
• Batuša (606)
• Batušinac (830)
• Bavanište (6106)
• Bazovik (203)
• Baćevac (1624)
• Baćica (347)
• Baćoglava (263)
• Bač (6087)
• Bačevci (167)
• Bačevci (505)
• Bačevica (409)
• Bačevina (214)
• Bačevo (19)
• Bačija (30)
• Bačina (2381)
• Bačinac (789)
• Bačinci (1374)
• Bačka Palanka (29449)
• Bačka Topola (16171)
• Bački Breg (1388)
• Bački Brestovac (3469)
• Bački Gračac (2913)
• Bački Jarak (6049)
• Bački Monoštor (3920)
• Bački Petrovac (6727)
• Bački Sokolac (609)
• Bački Vinogradi (2039)
• Bačko Dobro Polje (3929)
• Bačko Dušanovo (741)
• Bačko Gradište (5445)
• Bačko Novo Selo (1228)
• Bačko Petrovo Selo (7318)
• Bačvište (65)
• Bašaid (3503)
• Bašin (552)
• Baščeluci (980)
• Bedina Varoš (1681)
• Begaljica (3255)
• Begeč (3335)
• Begovo Brdo (526)
• Bekova (116)
• Bela (37)
• Bela Crkva (755)
• Bela Crkva (10675)
• Bela Palanka (8626)
• Bela Reka (917)
• Bela Stena (491)
• Bela Voda (207)
• Bela Voda (1387)
• Belanovce (600)
• Belanovce (113)
• Belanovica (266)
• Belasica (402)
• Bele Vode (872)
• Belegiš (3116)
• Beleš (830)
• Beli Breg (269)
• Beli Breg (94)
• Beli Kamen (508)
• Beli Kamen (27)
• Beli Potok (243)
• Beli Potok (629)
• Beli Potok (238)
• Beli Potok (3417)
• Belica (393)
• Belić (124)
• Beliševo (136)
• Belja (43)
• Beljajka (265)
• Beljevac (160)
• Beljin (657)
• Beljina (810)
• Beljina (1117)
• Belo Blato (1477)
• Belo Polje (50)
• Belo Polje (256)
• Belo Polje (151)
• Belo Polje (1804)
• Belo Polje (48)
• Belo Polje (545)
• Belogoš (88)
• Beloinje (343)
• Beloljin (569)
• Belosavci (1182)
• Belotinac (1321)
• Belotić (654)
• Belotić (552)
• Belotić (1744)
• Beloševac (849)
• Belut (85)
• Beluće (263)
• Belušić (934)
• Beoci (462)
• Beomužević (528)
• Beočin (8058)
• Beočić (467)
• Beranje (491)
• Berbatovo  (364)
• Berduj (157)
• Berilje (730)
• Berilovac (1933)
• Berin Izvor (90)
• Berkasovo (1228)
• Berkovac (564)
• Berlovine (276)
• Berovica (30)
• Berčevac (19)
• Berčinac  (129)
• Berčinovac (172)
• Beršići (351)
• Beserovina (213)
• Bezdan (5263)
• Bečanj (1044)
• Bečej (25774)
• Bečevica (364)
• Bečmen (3409)
• Bešenovački Prnjavor (145)
• Bešenovo (965)
• Beška (6239)
• Bežište (175)
• Bigrenica (979)
• Bikinje (265)
• Bikić Do (336)
• Bikovo (1824)
• Biljanovac (587)
• Biljača (2036)
• Biljeg (526)
• Bilo (14)
• Bingula (906)
• Biniće (179)
• Binovac (444)
• Binovce (553)
• Bioc (74)
• Biohane (98)
• Bioska (554)
• Biočin (50)
• Biskupići (22)
• Biskuplje (430)
• Bistar (174)
• Bistrica (8)
• Bistrica (497)
• Bistrica (79)
• Bistrica (791)
• Bistrica (828)
• Bitvrđa (23)
• Bivolje (330)
• Bjelahova (82)
• Bjeloperica (314)
• Bjelotići (261)
• Bjeluša (565)
• Blaca (33)
• Blace (5465)
• Blagojev Kamen (38)
• Blato (630)
• Blato (65)
• Blaznava (591)
• Blaževo (183)
• Blendija (352)
• Bliznak (361)
• Blizonje (281)
• Bobište (1782)
• Bobote (360)
• Bobova (391)
• Bobovik (307)
• Bobovište (1074)
• Bobovo (1349)
• Bogalinac (163)
• Bogaraš (94)
• Bogaraš (724)
• Bogatić (129)
• Bogatić (7350)
• Bogava (576)
• Bogdanica (312)
• Bogdanje (1055)
• Bogdanovac (170)
• Bogdanovac (101)
• Bogdanovica (348)
• Bogdinac (201)
• Bogiše (331)
• Bogojevce (1571)
• Bogojevići (629)
• Bogojevo (2120)
• Bogosavac (1159)
• Bogovađa (574)
• Bogovina (1348)
• Bogoševo (176)
• Bogoštica (269)
• Bogujevac (84)
• Bogujevac (26)
• Bogunovac (89)
• Boguti (72)
• Bogutovac (547)
• Bojanići (94)
• Bojin Del (87)
• Bojince (82)
• Bojić (382)
• Bojišina (245)
• Bojnik (3159)
• Boka (1734)
• Boleč (5750)
• Boljare (33)
• Boljare (983)
• Boljetin (672)
• Boljevac (151)
• Boljevac Selo (315)
• Boljevac (3784)
• Boljevci (4056)
• Boljkovci (489)
• Bor (39387)
• Boranci (45)
• Borač (692)
• Borci (389)
• Borin Do (148)
• Borince (45)
• Borišiće (83)
• Borovac (166)
• Borovac (59)
• Borovac (167)
• Boroviće (177)
• Boroviće (73)
• Borovo (174)
• Boroštica (379)
• Borča  (35150)
• Bosilegrad (2702)
• Bosut (1139)
• Bosuta (606)
• Botoš (2148)
• Botunja (373)
• Botunje (649)
• Boturići (263)
• Boturovina (218)
• Bovan (554)
• Bovan (179)
• Bovanj (29)
• Bozoljin (129)
• Boće (70)
• Boćevica (151)
• Bočar (1895)
• Bođani (1113)
• Bošnjace (1629)
• Bošnjak (481)
• Bošnjane  (1012)
• Bošnjane (559)
• Bošnjane (1963)
• Bošnjanović (286)
• Boždarevac (1218)
• Božetići (392)
• Boževac (1788)
• Božica (333)
• Božinjevac (376)
• Božinovac (26)
• Božov Potok (195)
• Božurevac (311)
• Božurnja (672)
• Bradarac (334)
• Bradarac (874)
• Bradić (841)
• Brajinovac (221)
• Brajići (65)
• Brajkovac (367)
• Brajkovac (1002)
• Brajkovac (87)
• Brajkovići (724)
• Braljina (266)
• Braljina (118)
• Branešci (744)
• Brangović (172)
• Braničevo (942)
• Brankovci (116)
• Brankovina (573)
• Brančić (563)
• Brasina (1663)
• Bratačić (310)
• Bratinac (629)
• Bratići (120)
• Bratiševac (194)
• Bratljevo (220)
• Bratmilovce (3531)
• Bratoselce (71)
• Braćak (230)
• Braćevac (533)
• Braćevci (12)
• Brdarica (1519)
• Brdo (333)
• Brebevnica (62)
• Bregovi (57)
• Bregovina (70)
• Brejanovce (364)
• Brekovo (671)
• Brenica  (555)
• Bresje (656)
• Bresje (230)
• Bresnica (77)
• Bresnica (229)
• Bresnica (410)
• Bresnica (1466)
• Bresnik (184)
• Bresnik (18)
• Bresničić (261)
• Bresno Polje (725)
• Brest (562)
• Brestač  (1066)
• Brestov Dol (32)
• Brestovac (276)
• Brestovac (2950)
• Brestovac (224)
• Brestovac (2086)
• Brestovac (2086)
• Brestovac (355)
• Brestovik (1076)
• Brestovo (397)
• Brestovo (5)
• Brestovo (115)
• Breza (212)
• Brezjak (241)
• Brezna (209)
• Brezna (104)
• Brezna (60)
• Breznica (1362)
• Breznica (211)
• Brezova (551)
• Brezova (482)
• Brezovac (797)
• Brezovica (126)
• Brezovica (636)
• Brezovica (668)
• Brezovica (165)
• Brezovica (141)
• Brezovice (964)
• Brezovice (506)
• Brežane (1017)
• Brežani (61)
• Brežđe (572)
• Brgule (1235)
• Brgulice (501)
• Bričevlje (241)
• Brlog (83)
• Brniševo (88)
• Brnjac (631)
• Brnjare (114)
• Brnjica (391)
• Brnjica (348)
• Brnjica (218)
• Brod (122)
• Brodarevo (1780)
• Brodica (468)
• Brović (783)
• Brus (4653)
• Brusnica (650)
• Brusnik (436)
• Brusnik (456)
• Brvenica (298)
• Brvenik Naselje (408)
• Brvenik (67)
• Brvine (175)
• Brza Palanka (1076)
• Brza (1211)
• Brzan (2073)
• Brzeće (258)
• Brzi Brod  (4452)
• Brzohode (825)
• Brđani (198)
• Brđani (1227)
• Brđani (195)
• Brštica (1254)
• Buar (1415)
• Bubanj  (516)
• Bublica (202)
• Bubušinac (844)
• Buceljevo (22)
• Buci (433)
• Budilovina (293)
• Budisava (3825)
• Budišić (249)
• Budoželja (282)
• Bujanovac (12011)
• Bujačić (357)
• Bujić (89)
• Bujkovac (796)
• Bujkoviće (53)
• Bukarevac (905)
• Bukor (818)
• Bukorovac (229)
• Bukova Glava (295)
• Bukovac (490)
• Bukovac (202)
• Bukovac (108)
• Bukovac (3585)
• Bukovica (1686)
• Bukovica (599)
• Bukovica (242)
• Bukovik (311)
• Bukovik (107)
• Bukovik (2743)
• Bukovska (503)
• Bukovče (750)
• Bukovče (1442)
• Bukuloram (12)
• Bukurovac (26)
• Bulatovac (137)
• Bulinovac (194)
• Buljane  (1545)
• Buljesovce (78)
• Bumbarevo Brdo (520)
• Bunar (495)
• Bunuški Čifluk (505)
• Burađa (258)
• Burdimo (406)
• Burovac (849)
• Burovo (468)
• Busenje (94)
• Busilovac  (1041)
• Busur (1171)
• Buvce (109)
• Bučince (12)
• Bučić (549)
• Bučje (666)
• Bučje (369)
• Bučje (186)
• Bučje (458)
• Bučum (106)
• Buđanovci (1757)
• Buđevo (91)
• Buštranje (872)
• Buštranje (487)
• Buštranje (80)
• Bzenice (421)
• Bzovik (205)

C
Cakanovac (221)
• Caparić (448)
• Carevac (899)
• Carina (654)
• Caričina (20)
• Cekavica (507)
• Ceremošnja (317)
• Cerev Del (30)
• Cerevajka (70)
• Cerje  (306)
• Cerje (168)
• Cerje (625)
• Cernica (275)
• Cerova (1151)
• Cerova (112)
• Cerova (965)
• Cerova (401)
• Cerova (171)
• Cerovac (904)
• Cerovac (1177)
• Cerovac (479)
• Cerovica (381)
• Cerovica (54)
• Cerovo (66)
• Cetanoviće (386)
• Cikot (258)
• Cikote (272)
• Cikote (1173)
• Cokoviće (20)
• Crcavac (141)
• Crepaja (4855)
• Crkovnica (133)
• Crkvenac (1282)
• Crkveni Toci (78)
• Crkvice (643)
• Crkvina (210)
• Crkvine (214)
• Crkvine (136)
• Crljenac (969)
• Crna Bara (175)
• Crna Bara (2270)
• Crna Bara (224)
• Crna Bara (568)
• Crna Glava (246)
• Crna Reka (41)
• Crna Trava (563)
• Crnajka (1099)
• Crnatovo (176)
• Crni Kao (446)
• Crni Kao (504)
• Crni Lug (266)
• Crni Vrh (133)
• Crni Vrh (141)
• Crni Vrh (32)
• Crnoklište (338)
• Crnoljevica (219)
• Crnomasnica (272)
• Crnotince (1454)
• Crnovce (136)
• Crnoštica (190)
• Crnugovići (93)
• Crnuzi (445)
• Crnča (1213)
• Crnče (64)
• Crnče (248)
• Crvena Crkva (729)
• Crvena Jabuka (126)
• Crvena Jabuka (631)
• Crvena Reka (303)
• Crveni Breg (371)
• Crveni Breg (30)
• Crveni Grad (149)
• Crvenje (152)
• Crvenka (10163)
• Crvenčevo (135)
• Crvica (756)
• Crvsko (140)
• Crčevo (49)
• Culine (389)
• Culjković (720)
• Cvetanovac (594)
• Cvetke (1070)
• Cvetojevac (719)
• Cvetovac (233)
• Cvetulja (273)

Č
Čadinje (267)
• Čagrovac (161)
• Čairi (469)
• Čajetina (3162)
• Čalma (1675)
• Čamurlija  (546)
• Čantavir (7178)
• Čapljinac (1008)
• Čar (296)
• Čarovina (238)
• Čauševići (132)
• Čačak (73217)
• Čašić Dolac (76)
• Čedovo (108)
• Čekmin (915)
• Čelarevo (5423)
• Čelice (78)
• Čenej (2115)
• Čenta (3119)
• Čepure  (825)
• Čerević (2826)
• Česta (215)
• Čestelin (22)
• Čestereg (1391)
• Čestin (674)
• Čestobrodica (327)
• Četereže (641)
• Čečina (834)
• Čečina (243)
• Češko Selo (46)
• Češljeva Bara (489)
• Čibukovac (1114)
• Čibutkovica (1260)
• Čiflik (103)
• Čifluk Razgojnski (335)
• Činiglavci (331)
• Čipalje (144)
• Čitluk (3154)
• Čitluk (941)
• Čitluk (238)
• Čitluk (195)
• Čitluk (142)
• Čitluk (806)
• Čmanjke (84)
• Čoka (4707)
• Čokešina (881)
• Čokonjar (173)
• Čokot  (1401)
• Čokotar (33)
• Čokotin (56)
• Čonoplja (4359)
• Čortanovci (2308)
• Čubra (557)
• Čubura (96)
• Čubura (194)
• Čuka (25)
• Čukarka (512)
• Čukljenik  (287)
• Čukljenik (636)
• Čukojevac (1204)
• Čukote (136)
• Čukurovac (122)
• Čumić (1600)
• Čungula (419)
• Čurug (8882)
• Čučale (233)
• Čučuge (463)

Ć
Ćelije (62)
• Ćelije (268)
• Ćelije (824)
• Ćenovac (423)
• Ćirikovac (1407)
• Ćićevac (5094)
• Ćićina (238)
• Ćovdin (1066)
• Ćukovac (122)
• Ćukovac (360)
• Ćukovac (1007)
• Ćukovine (375)
• Ćulije (76)
• Ćuprija (20585)
• Ćurkovica (261)
• Ćurkovica (13)
• Ćurlina (193)
• Ćuštica (253)

D
Dabinovac (64)
• Dadince (195)
• Dajići (313)
• Danjino Selo (81)
• Dankoviće (232)
• Darkovce (205)
• Darosava (2023)
• Davidovac  (461)
• Davidovac (610)
• Davidovac (199)
• Davidovac (502)
• Davidovica (91)
• Dašnica (697)
• Dašnica (115)
• Debeli Lug (34)
• Debeli Lug (458)
• Debelica (423)
• Debelja (148)
• Debeljača (5325)
• Debrc (875)
• Dedevci (341)
• Dedina Bara (802)
• Dedina (2775)
• Dedinac (124)
• Degrmen (88)
• Degurić (383)
• Dejance (57)
• Dejanovac (27)
• Dekutince (271)
• Deliblato (3498)
• Deligrad (211)
• Delimeđe (445)
• Deonica (550)
• Depce (441)
• Deretin (259)
• Deronje (2847)
• Desimirovac (1401)
• Desine (717)
• Desić (302)
• Despotovac (4363)
• Despotovo (2096)
• Detane (224)
• Deveti maj  (4305)
• Devići (189)
• Devojački Bunar (0)
• Devreč (106)
• Devča (492)
• Deč  (1590)
• Dešilovo (429)
• Dešiška (38)
• Deževa (238)
• Dikava (142)
• Dimitrovgrad (6968)
• Divci (335)
• Divci (717)
• Divljana (141)
• Divostin (399)
• Divoš (1585)
• Divčibare (235)
• Dići (156)
• Dljin (1060)
• Dobanovci (8128)
• Dobra (678)
• Dobra Voda (88)
• Dobra Voda (430)
• Dobrača (493)
• Dobrače (821)
• Dobrejance (84)
• Dobri Do (308)
• Dobri Do (109)
• Dobri Do (116)
• Dobri Do (1118)
• Dobri Dub (240)
• Dobrica (1344)
• Dobrilovići (490)
• Dobrinci (1716)
• Dobrinje (101)
• Dobrić (1205)
• Dobričevo (226)
• Dobrnje (643)
• Dobro Polje (415)
• Dobro Polje (16)
• Dobrodo (275)
• Dobrodol (127)
• Dobroljubci (374)
• Dobromir (131)
• Dobroselica (36)
• Dobroselica (405)
• Dobrosin (747)
• Dobrotin (251)
• Dobrotin (321)
• Dobrotić (37)
• Dobroviš (141)
• Dobrovodica (420)
• Dobrujevac (388)
• Dobrujevac (236)
• Doganica (50)
• Dojinoviće (120)
• Dojkinci (273)
• Dokmir (558)
• Dol (82)
• Dolac (430)
• Dolac (198)
• Dolac (87)
• Dolac (72)
• Doline (516)
• Doliće (322)
• Doljane (262)
• Doljani (89)
• Doljašnica (409)
• Doljevac (1625)
• Dolovo (465)
• Dolovo (Pančevo)  (6835)
• Domiševina (104)
• Donja Badanja (510)
• Donja Bejašnica (14)
• Donja Bela Reka (823)
• Donja Bela Reka (287)
• Donja Borina (1731)
• Donja Bresnica (219)
• Donja Bukovica (556)
• Donja Bunuša (306)
• Donja Crnišava (410)
• Donja Crnuća (323)
• Donja Dobrinja (524)
• Donja Draguša (120)
• Donja Glama (26)
• Donja Gorevnica (904)
• Donja Jajina (1338)
• Donja Jošanica (98)
• Donja Kamenica (360)
• Donja Konjuša (305)
• Donja Koritnica (216)
• Donja Kravarica (459)
• Donja Kruševica (350)
• Donja Kupinovica (97)
• Donja Lapaštica (53)
• Donja Lisina (316)
• Donja Livadica (2053)
• Donja Ljubata (395)
• Donja Ljuboviđa (951)
• Donja Lokošnica (1060)
• Donja Lomnica (591)
• Donja Lopušnja (184)
• Donja Mikuljana (83)
• Donja Mutnica  (1051)
• Donja Nevlja (31)
• Donja Omašnica (708)
• Donja Orovica (424)
• Donja Otulja (101)
• Donja Peščanica (122)
• Donja Pološnica (97)
• Donja Rasovača (538)
• Donja Rača (1008)
• Donja Rašica (98)
• Donja Rečica (394)
• Donja Ržana (79)
• Donja Sabanta (651)
• Donja Sipulja (244)
• Donja Slatina (300)
• Donja Sokolovica (136)
• Donja Stražava (722)
• Donja Studena  (324)
• Donja Toponica  (290)
• Donja Toponica (352)
• Donja Trepča (1018)
• Donja Trešnjevica (304)
• Donja Trešnjica (688)
• Donja Trnava  (697)
• Donja Trnava (1600)
• Donja Trnava (921)
• Donja Trnica (213)
• Donja Vrbava (654)
• Donja Vrežina  (4088)
• Donja Zleginja (296)
• Donja Šatornja (800)
• Donja Šušaja (342)
• Donje Babine (319)
• Donje Brijanje (1487)
• Donje Crnatovo (519)
• Donje Crniljevo (981)
• Donje Dragovlje (452)
• Donje Gare (165)
• Donje Goračiće (57)
• Donje Grbice (557)
• Donje Grgure (127)
• Donje Jabukovo (152)
• Donje Jarušice (265)
• Donje Komarice (545)
• Donje Konjuvce (520)
• Donje Kordince (226)
• Donje Krajince (764)
• Donje Krnjino (271)
• Donje Leskovice (597)
• Donje Leviće (87)
• Donje Lopiže (123)
• Donje Međurovo  (1414)
• Donje Nedeljice (566)
• Donje Novo Selo (120)
• Donje Punoševce (21)
• Donje Rataje (930)
• Donje Romanovce (509)
• Donje Sinkovce (1661)
• Donje Stopanje (1136)
• Donje Suhotno (320)
• Donje Svarče (122)
• Donje Tlamino (211)
• Donje Točane (122)
• Donje Trebešinje (832)
• Donje Trnjane (289)
• Donje Vidovo  (1932)
• Donje Vlase  (152)
• Donje Vranovce (331)
• Donje Zuniče (407)
• Donje Štiplje (272)
• Donje Žapsko (421)
• Donji Adrovac (761)
• Donji Banjani (224)
• Donji Barbeš (217)
• Donji Branetići (134)
• Donji Bunibrod (644)
• Donji Bučumet (186)
• Donji Dejan (497)
• Donji Dobrić (1438)
• Donji Drenovac (450)
• Donji Dubac (526)
• Donji Dubič (214)
• Donji Dušnik (591)
• Donji Gajtan (142)
• Donji Katun (1012)
• Donji Komren  (5725)
• Donji Kozji Dol (291)
• Donji Krivodol (19)
• Donji Krupac (364)
• Donji Krčin (351)
• Donji Lajkovac (494)
• Donji Lipovac (209)
• Donji Ljubeš (597)
• Donji Matejevac  (861)
• Donji Milanovac (3132)
• Donji Mušić (243)
• Donji Neradovac (633)
• Donji Petrovci (991)
• Donji Prisjan (330)
• Donji Račnik (649)
• Donji Ribnik (624)
• Donji Rinj (13)
• Donji Stajevac (461)
• Donji Statovac (74)
• Donji Stepoš (484)
• Donji Stranjani (120)
• Donji Striževac (259)
• Donji Stupanj (1068)
• Donji Tavankut (2631)
• Donji Tovarnik (1016)
• Donji Vratari (297)
• Doroslovo (1830)
• Draga (950)
• Draganići (350)
• Dragi Deo (62)
• Dragijevica (681)
• Draginac (885)
• Draginac (324)
• Draginje (1701)
• Draglica (257)
• Dragobraća (845)
• Dragobužde (49)
• Dragocvet (1003)
• Dragodol (611)
• Dragojevac (312)
• Dragojevac (862)
• Dragojloviće (114)
• Dragolj (364)
• Dragosinjci (672)
• Dragovac (1005)
• Dragovac (910)
• Dragovita (81)
• Dragovo (1125)
• Dragočevo (112)
• Dragoševac (501)
• Dragušica (247)
• Drajinac (706)
• Drajinci (78)
• Draksin (144)
• Drakčići (638)
• Dramiće (80)
• Drača (828)
• Dračić (264)
• Draškovac (791)
• Dražanj (1548)
• Draževac (1188)
• Draževac (1536)
• Draževiće (431)
• Draževići (419)
• Draževo (30)
• Dražiniće (108)
• Dražinovići (352)
• Dražmirovac (438)
• Dren (445)
• Dren (1279)
• Drence (149)
• Drenova (102)
• Drenova (264)
• Drenova (208)
• Drenova (135)
• Drenovac  (2009)
• Drenovac (141)
• Drenovac (356)
• Drenovac (161)
• Drenovac (167)
• Drenovac (2345)
• Drenovci (395)
• Drenča (255)
• Drečinovac (88)
• Drešnica (102)
• Drežnica (86)
• Drežnik (761)
• Drijetanj (1092)
• Drlače (430)
• Drlupa (143)
• Drlupa (547)
• Drmanovići (368)
• Drmno (1046)
• Drtevci (38)
• Drugovac (1906)
• Družetić (669)
• Družetići (703)
• Družiniće (19)
• Drvnik (15)
• Drvodelj (95)
• Drvodelja (245)
• Drćevac (309)
• Držanovac (947)
• Držina (472)
• Dub (419)
• Dublje (3317)
• Dublje (1050)
• Dublje (492)
• Dubnica (142)
• Dubnica (380)
• Dubnica (607)
• Dubnica (819)
• Duboka (737)
• Duboka (1110)
• Duboko (484)
• Duboko (847)
• Dubona (1139)
• Dubovac (1283)
• Dubovo (916)
• Dubovo (608)
• Dubočane (455)
• Dubočka (582)
• Dubrava (17)
• Dubrava (1839)
• Dubrava (173)
• Dubrava (45)
• Dubravica (1225)
• Dudovica (777)
• Dudulajce (363)
• Duga Luka (154)
• Duga Poljana (60)
• Duga Poljana (594)
• Dugi Del (42)
• Dugo Polje (690)
• Dugojnica (275)
• Dujke (152)
• Dukat (397)
• Dukat (265)
• Dulan (97)
• Dulebe (56)
• Dulene (218)
• Dumbija (36)
• Dunavac  (603)
• Dunišiće (190)
• Dupci (456)
• Dupeljevo (55)
• Dupljaj (452)
• Dupljaja (854)
• Dupljane (564)
• Dupljane (161)
• Duvanište (610)
• Dučalovići (440)
• Dučevac (136)
• Dučina (736)
• Dučić (641)
• Dušanovac (882)
• Dušanovo (236)
• Duškovci (369)
• Dušmanić (176)
• Dušmanići (245)
• Dužine (219)
• Dvorane (594)
• Dvorica (246)
• Dvorište (565)
• Dvorište (305)
• Dvorište (282)
• Dvorska (1064)

Dž
Džep (194)
• Džepnica (231)
• Džigolj (276)
• Džurovo (179)

Đ
Đake (83)
• Đakovo (244)
• Đakus (904)
• Đala (1004)
• Đerađ (76)
• Đerekarce (156)
• Đerekare (518)
• Đerekari (23)
• Đinđuša (675)
• Đulekare (117)
• Đunis (812)
• Đurakovo (338)
• Đurašići (265)
• Đurevac (353)
• Đurinac (309)
• Đurinac (200)
• Đurinci (1088)
• Đuriselo (699)
• Đurovac (147)
• Đurđevac (297)
• Đurđevo (726)
• Đurđevo (5137)
• Đurđin (1746)
• Đušnica (59)

E
Elemir (4690)
• Erdevik (3316)
• Erdeč (67)
• Ervenice (57)
• Erčege (200)
• Ečka (4513)

F
Farkaždin (1386)
• Feketić (4336)
• Fijulj (103)
• Filipovići (177)
• Filić (161)
• Futog (18582)

G
Gabrovac  (1189)
• Gabrovnica (10)
• Gadžin Han (1245)
• Gagince (132)
• Gaglovo (811)
• Gaj (3302)
• Gajdobra (2968)
• Gakovo (2201)
• Galibabinac (342)
• Galović (235)
• Galovići (263)
• Gamzigrad (945)
• Garaši (605)
• Gardinovci (1485)
• Gare (59)
• Garevina (421)
• Garevo (280)
• Gari (535)
• Garinje (554)
• Gavez (140)
• Gazdare (571)
• Geglja (264)
• Gibarac (1158)
• Glasovik (155)
• Glavica  (1134)
• Glavinci (636)
• Glašince (427)
• Gledić (352)
• Gleđica (269)
• Glibovac (2269)
• Globare (402)
• Globoder (1656)
• Glogonj  (3178)
• Glogovac (47)
• Glogovac (967)
• Glogovac (1561)
• Glogovac (73)
• Glogovica (874)
• Glogovica (484)
• Glogovik (157)
• Gložan (2283)
• Gložane (1017)
• Gložane (660)
• Gložje (327)
• Gluhavica (265)
• Glumač (803)
• Glušci (2346)
• Gnila (14)
• Gnjilan (2478)
• Gnjilica (228)
• Godačica (1066)
• Godečevo (599)
• Godljevo (348)
• Godovik (289)
• Godovo (89)
• Gojakovići (183)
• Gojin Dol (264)
• Gojinovac (78)
• Gojmanovac (94)
• Gojna Gora (735)
• Gokčanica (86)
• Gola Glava (793)
• Golema Njiva (118)
• Golemi Dol (294)
• Golemo Selo (1051)
• Goleš (36)
• Golešnica (4)
• Goli Rid (57)
• Golice (64)
• Golobok (2396)
• Golovo (212)
• Goločelo (584)
• Goločelo (541)
• Goločevac (63)
• Golubac (152)
• Golubac (1896)
• Goluban (42)
• Golubinci (5129)
• Golubinje (1079)
• Golubovac  (267)
• Golubovac (289)
• Goračići (1276)
• Gorina (732)
• Gorić (491)
• Goričani (780)
• Gorjani (735)
• Gornja Badanja (598)
• Gornja Bejašnica (30)
• Gornja Bela Reka (224)
• Gornja Bela Reka (185)
• Gornja Borina (188)
• Gornja Bresnica (169)
• Gornja Bukovica (1117)
• Gornja Bunuša (633)
• Gornja Crnišava (430)
• Gornja Crnuća (239)
• Gornja Dobrinja (505)
• Gornja Draguša (258)
• Gornja Držina (29)
• Gornja Glama (34)
• Gornja Gorevnica (1399)
• Gornja Grabovica (1366)
• Gornja Jajina (637)
• Gornja Jošanica (329)
• Gornja Kamenica (377)
• Gornja Konjuša (66)
• Gornja Koritnica (109)
• Gornja Koviljača (585)
• Gornja Koznica (77)
• Gornja Kravarica (419)
• Gornja Kupinovica (189)
• Gornja Lapaštica (194)
• Gornja Lisina (474)
• Gornja Ljubata (485)
• Gornja Ljuboviđa (443)
• Gornja Lokošnica (134)
• Gornja Lomnica (66)
• Gornja Lopušnja (67)
• Gornja Mikuljana (117)
• Gornja Mutnica  (740)
• Gornja Nevlja (40)
• Gornja Omašnica (665)
• Gornja Orovica (415)
• Gornja Otulja (13)
• Gornja Peščanica (248)
• Gornja Pološnica (152)
• Gornja Rasovača (250)
• Gornja Rečica (152)
• Gornja Rogatica (477)
• Gornja Ržana (95)
• Gornja Sabanta (839)
• Gornja Sipulja (250)
• Gornja Slatina (210)
• Gornja Sokolovica (41)
• Gornja Stražava (768)
• Gornja Studena  (393)
• Gornja Toponica  (1550)
• Gornja Toponica (60)
• Gornja Trepča (618)
• Gornja Trešnjevica (583)
• Gornja Trešnjica (291)
• Gornja Trnava  (309)
• Gornja Trnava (429)
• Gornja Trnava (1736)
• Gornja Trnica (86)
• Gornja Tušimlja (33)
• Gornja Vranjska (1582)
• Gornja Vrbava (145)
• Gornja Vrežina  (1180)
• Gornja Zleginja (457)
• Gornja Šatornja (558)
• Gornja Šušaja (101)
• Gornjane (1114)
• Gornje Babine (262)
• Gornje Brijanje (509)
• Gornje Crnatovo (391)
• Gornje Crniljevo (554)
• Gornje Dragovlje (431)
• Gornje Gare (80)
• Gornje Goračiće (58)
• Gornje Grbice (273)
• Gornje Grgure (327)
• Gornje Jabukovo (154)
• Gornje Jarušice (655)
• Gornje Komarice (322)
• Gornje Konjuvce (172)
• Gornje Kordince (224)
• Gornje Košlje (649)
• Gornje Krajince (786)
• Gornje Krnjino (248)
• Gornje Leskovice (463)
• Gornje Leviće (138)
• Gornje Lopiže (57)
• Gornje Međurovo  (1021)
• Gornje Nedeljice (699)
• Gornje Novo Selo (437)
• Gornje Punoševce (40)
• Gornje Rataje (769)
• Gornje Romanovce (50)
• Gornje Sinkovce (454)
• Gornje Stopanje (1756)
• Gornje Suhotno (343)
• Gornje Svarče (128)
• Gornje Tlamino (184)
• Gornje Točane (18)
• Gornje Trebešinje (213)
• Gornje Trnjane (250)
• Gornje Trudovo (139)
• Gornje Vidovo  (855)
• Gornje Vlase (171)
• Gornje Vranovce (207)
• Gornje Zuniče (475)
• Gornje Štiplje (190)
• Gornje Žapsko (109)
• Gornji Adrovac (134)
• Gornji Banjani (227)
• Gornji Barbeš (488)
• Gornji Branetići (578)
• Gornji Breg (1889)
• Gornji Bunibrod (762)
• Gornji Bučumet (139)
• Gornji Crniš (36)
• Gornji Dejan (208)
• Gornji Dobrić (728)
• Gornji Drenovac (420)
• Gornji Dubac (306)
• Gornji Dubič (109)
• Gornji Dušnik (237)
• Gornji Gajtan (87)
• Gornji Katun (1468)
• Gornji Komren  (946)
• Gornji Kozji Dol (101)
• Gornji Krivodol (17)
• Gornji Krupac (510)
• Gornji Krčin (243)
• Gornji Lajkovac (446)
• Gornji Lipovac (90)
• Gornji Ljubeš (240)
• Gornji Matejevac  (2647)
• Gornji Milanovac (23982)
• Gornji Mušić (431)
• Gornji Neradovac (326)
• Gornji Orah (330)
• Gornji Prisjan (270)
• Gornji Račnik (124)
• Gornji Ribnik (596)
• Gornji Rinj (10)
• Gornji Stajevac (160)
• Gornji Statovac (45)
• Gornji Stepoš (832)
• Gornji Stranjani (85)
• Gornji Striževac (154)
• Gornji Stupanj (674)
• Gornji Tavankut (1381)
• Gornji Vratari (200)
• Gornovac (74)
• Gorobilje (1506)
• Gorovič (319)
• Gorčinci (537)
• Gospođince (41)
• Gospođinci (3896)
• Gostilje (344)
• Gostinica (639)
• Gostiradiće (53)
• Gostun (49)
• Gostuša (139)
• Goč (68)
• Goševo (50)
• Goševo (70)
• Grab (315)
• Grabovac (760)
• Grabovac (2596)
• Grabovac (14)
• Grabovac (1012)
• Grabovac (125)
• Grabovci (1480)
• Grabovica (801)
• Grabovica (496)
• Grabovica (880)
• Grabovica (44)
• Grabovnica (118)
• Grabovo (138)
• Grabovo (193)
• Grad (97)
• Grad Stalać (800)
• Gradac (245)
• Gradac (134)
• Gradac (86)
• Gradac (368)
• Gradac (150)
• Gradac (95)
• Gradašnica (472)
• Gradašnica (412)
• Gradinje (204)
• Gradište (65)
• Gradište (31)
• Gradište (596)
• Gradište (86)
• Gradište (225)
• Gradnja (247)
• Gradojević (250)
• Gradskovo (666)
• Grajevce (404)
• Gramada (19)
• Gramađe (246)
• Granica (172)
• Granice (1460)
• Graovo (277)
• Grapa (4)
• Gračac (2011)
• Gračane (28)
• Gračanica (465)
• Gračanica (199)
• Građanoviće (19)
• Graševci (499)
• Grbavce (276)
• Grbavče (567)
• Grdanica (605)
• Grdelica (2383)
• Grdelica (1172)
• Grdica (730)
• Grdovići (471)
• Grebenac (1017)
• Gredetin (659)
• Grejač (696)
• Grevci (415)
• Grezna (329)
• Grgaje (87)
• Grgetek (85)
• Grgurevci (1312)
• Grgurovce (420)
• Grivac (458)
• Grivska (357)
• Grkinja (771)
• Grkljane (468)
• Grlište (857)
• Grljan (2839)
• Grnčar (159)
• Grnčara (654)
• Grobnice (254)
• Grocka (8338)
• Groznatovci (40)
• Grošnica (1280)
• Grubetiće (259)
• Grudaš (280)
• Grujinci (93)
• Grušić (874)
• Gruža (201)
• Grčac (1176)
• Grčak (145)
• Grčić (334)
• Gubavce (36)
• Guberevac (790)
• Guberevac (1875)
• Guberevac (646)
• Guberevci (804)
• Gubetin (225)
• Gubin Do (451)
• Guceviće (67)
• Gudurica (1267)
• Gugalj (280)
• Gujiće (133)
• Gukoš (332)
• Gulenovci (60)
• Gulijan (201)
• Gumerište (26)
• Gunaroš (1441)
• Guncati (2102)
• Guncati (943)
• Gunjaci (1359)
• Gunjetina (97)
• Gunjevac (497)
• Gunjica (152)
• Gurdijelje (93)
• Gurgutovo (59)
• Guriševci (153)
• Guča (2010)
• Guča (2022)
• Guševac (320)
• Gvozdac (642)
• Gvozdenović (468)

H
Hajdukovo (2482)
• Hajdučica (1375)
• Halovo (856)
• Hercegovačka Goleša (430)
• Hetin (763)
• Hisardžik (285)
• Horgoš (6325)
• Hotkovo (193)
• Hrta (130)
• Hrtkovci (3428)
• Hum  (1450)

I
Idvor (1198)
• Igrište (42)
• Igrište (292)
• Igroš (637)
• Ilandža (1727)
• Ilince (136)
• Ilinci (827)
• Ilino (121)
• Inovo (100)
• Inđija (26247)
• Irig (4848)
• Iričići (40)
• Isakovo (646)
• Iskrovci (38)
• Istočni Mojstir (138)
• Ivan Kula (39)
• Ivanje (88)
• Ivanje (1140)
• Ivanjica (12350)
• Ivankovac (267)
• Ivanovci (468)
• Ivanovo  (1131)
• Ivanča (813)
• Ivezići (170)
• Ivkovački Prnjavor (102)
• Izatovci (31)
• Izbenica (531)
• Izbice (1949)
• Izbičanj (46)
• Izbište (1728)
• Izrok (107)
• Izumno (357)
• Izvarica (376)
• Izvor  (929)
• Izvor (263)
• Izvor (115)
• Izvor (781)
• Izvor (722)
• Iđoš (2174)

J
Jablanica (435)
• Jablanica (109)
• Jablanica (331)
• Jablanica (642)
• Jablanica (27)
• Jablanica (85)
• Jablanica (924)
• Jablanka (281)
• Jabuka  (6312)
• Jabuka (502)
• Jabukovac (1884)
• Jabukovik (97)
• Jabučevo (22)
• Jabučje (154)
• Jabučje (3250)
• Jadranska Lešnica (2088)
• Jagličje (92)
• Jagnjilo (106)
• Jagnjilo (2279)
• Jagodina (35589)
• Jagoštica (152)
• Jajčić (407)
• Jakalj (472)
• Jakovac (349)
• Jakovlje (352)
• Jakovljevo (461)
• Jakovo (5949)
• Jalbotina (104)
• Jalovik Izvor (238)
• Jalovik (1950)
• Jamena (1130)
• Janja (37)
• Jankov Most (636)
• Janošik (1171)
• Janča (332)
• Jančići (204)
• Jarak (2235)
• Jarebice (1324)
• Jarebice (215)
• Jarešnik (96)
• Jarkovac (1817)
• Jarkovci (604)
• Jarmenovci (563)
• Jarsenovo (428)
• Jarčujak (836)
• Jasenak (664)
• Jasenica (581)
• Jasenica (427)
• Jasenica (989)
• Jasenje (210)
• Jasenov Del (198)
• Jasenovik  (416)
• Jasenovo (1446)
• Jasenovo (882)
• Jasenovo (272)
• Jasika (2040)
• Jasikovica (670)
• Jasikovo (717)
• Jastrebac (19)
• Jastrebac (221)
• Jastrebac (423)
• Javor (18)
• Javorje (1)
• Javorska Ravna Gora (139)
• Jazak (1100)
• Jazovik (144)
• Jazovnik (599)
• Jazovo (978)
• Jaša Tomić (2982)
• Jašunja (514)
• Jelakci (437)
• Jelav (679)
• Jelača (254)
• Jelašnica  (1695)
• Jelašnica (212)
• Jelašnica (289)
• Jelašnica (1173)
• Jelašnica (153)
• Jelen Do (167)
• Jelenac (375)
• Jelenča (1803)
• Jeliće (100)
• Jelovac (349)
• Jelovica (113)
• Jelovik (480)
• Jelovik (212)
• Jermenovci (1033)
• Jevik (60)
• Jevremovac (3310)
• Jezdina (267)
• Jezero (433)
• Jezero (24)
• Jezero (310)
• Jezgroviće (237)
• Ježevica (1330)
• Jova (21)
• Jovac (93)
• Jovac (1258)
• Jovanja (310)
• Jovanovac (1165)
• Jovanovac (513)
• Jovanovce (43)
• Jovine Livade (11)
• Jošanica (898)
• Jošanica (671)
• Jošanička Banja (1154)
• Jošanički Prnjavor (45)
• Joševa (1123)
• Joševa (455)
• Joševa (272)
• Jošje (291)
• Jug Bogdanovac (474)
• Jugovac (146)
• Jugovići (168)
• Junkovac (984)
• Junkovac (945)
• Junčevići (301)
• Južni Kočarnik (41)

K
Kacabać (668)
• Kacapun (74)
• Kadina Luka (508)
• Kajtasovo (287)
• Kalabovce (102)
• Kalafati (273)
• Kalanjevci (744)
• Kalenić (888)
• Kalenići (331)
• Kalenićki Prnjavor (154)
• Kalenovac (27)
• Kaletinac (101)
• Kalimance (108)
• Kalimanići (181)
• Kalinovac (480)
• Kalipolje (21)
• Kaličina (256)
• Kalište (478)
• Kalna (147)
• Kalna (553)
• Kalovo (48)
• Kaludra (103)
• Kaludra (327)
• Kaluđerce (206)
• Kaluđerica (22248)
• Kaluđerovići (164)
• Kaluđerovo (273)
• Kaluđerovo (132)
• Kambelevci (419)
• Kamena Gora (210)
• Kamenare (474)
• Kamendol (1067)
• Kamenica  (1651)
• Kamenica (103)
• Kamenica (276)
• Kamenica (30)
• Kamenica (37)
• Kamenica (696)
• Kamenica (431)
• Kamenica (180)
• Kamenica (189)
• Kamenica (272)
• Kamenica (1005)
• Kamenjani (283)
• Kamenjača (373)
• Kamenovo (1010)
• Kamešnica (442)
• Kamijevo (347)
• Kamik (112)
• Kandalica (52)
• Kanjevina (65)
• Kanjiža (10200)
• Kaona (712)
• Kaona (453)
• Kaona (341)
• Kaonik (1460)
• Kapidžija (1485)
• Kapit (253)
• Karadak (72)
• Karadnik (455)
• Karajukića Bunari (116)
• Karamanica (83)
• Karan (582)
• Karanovac (409)
• Karaula (63)
• Karavukovo (4991)
• Karađorđevac (417)
• Karađorđevo (1012)
• Karađorđevo (590)
• Karbulovo (520)
• Kare (54)
• Karlovčić (1243)
• Karoševina (199)
• Kasidol (744)
• Kasidoli (455)
• Kastrat (267)
• Katići (125)
• Katrga (1042)
• Katun (571)
• Katun (432)
• Kavadar (456)
• Kavilo (233)
• Kaznoviće (527)
• Kać (11166)
• Kaćevo (55)
• Kačapor (72)
• Kačarevo  (7624)
• Kačer (507)
• Kačulice (609)
• Kašalj (35)
• Kaševar (336)
• Kašice (88)
• Kaštavar (68)
• Kelebija (2168)
• Keserovina (589)
• Kevi (887)
• Kijevac (54)
• Kijevac (183)
• Kijevci (151)
• Kijevo (549)
• Kikinda (41935)
• Kikojevac (187)
• Kisač (5471)
• Kisiljevo (718)
• Kladnica (362)
• Kladovo (9142)
• Kladurovo (476)
• Kladušnica (727)
• Klajić (289)
• Klanica (590)
• Klatičevo (281)
• Klačevica  (600)
• Klašnić (128)
• Klašnjice (39)
• Klek (2959)
• Klekova (158)
• Klenak (3246)
• Klenike (268)
• Klenje (54)
• Klenje (3253)
• Klenje (493)
• Klenovac (250)
• Klenovnik (904)
• Klinci (269)
• Klinovac (539)
• Klisura (222)
• Klisura (184)
• Klisura (332)
• Klisurica (250)
• Klisurica (173)
• Kličevac (1329)
• Kljajićevo (6012)
• Ključ (498)
• Kloka (1146)
• Klokočevac (711)
• Klupci (7297)
• Knez Selo  (926)
• Kneževac (208)
• Kneževac (105)
• Kneževo (60)
• Knežica (586)
• Knežica (748)
• Knić (2294)
• Knićanin (2034)
• Knjaževac (19351)
• Kobilje (496)
• Kobilje (710)
• Kobilje (930)
• Kobišnica (1355)
• Koceljeva (4645)
• Kokošiće (124)
• Kolare (619)
• Kolari (1196)
• Kolunica (7)
• Kolut (1710)
• Komadine (218)
• Komanice (436)
• Komarane (254)
• Komarani (346)
• Komarica (198)
• Komirić (954)
• Komorane (113)
• Konak (996)
• Konarevo (3372)
• Konatice (909)
• Kondželj (180)
• Koniče (322)
• Konjarnik (104)
• Konjevići (788)
• Konjic (343)
• Konjino (913)
• Konjska Reka (112)
• Konjuh (1139)
• Konjuva (169)
• Konjuša (190)
• Konjuša (143)
• Konopnica (989)
• Končarevo (1628)
• Končić (134)
• Končulj (1306)
• Kopajkošara (112)
• Kopanjane (70)
• Kopaonik (18)
• Kopitarce (75)
• Kopljare (1024)
• Koprivna (49)
• Koprivnica (223)
• Koprivnica (99)
• Koprivnica (12)
• Koprivnica (532)
• Koprivštica (67)
• Koraćevac (192)
• Koraćica (1924)
• Korbevac (711)
• Korbovo (1067)
• Korbul (14)
• Korenita (2680)
• Koritnik (424)
• Korlaće (529)
• Korman (773)
• Korman (692)
• Korman (393)
• Kosančić (416)
• Kosančić (163)
• Kosatica (353)
• Kosjerić (1023)
• Kosjerić (4116)
• Kosmača (108)
• Kosmovac (110)
• Kosovica (240)
• Kostadinovac (306)
• Kostajnik (1048)
• Kostenica (289)
• Kostojevići (495)
• Kostol (1053)
• Kostolac (1313)
• Kostolac (9313)
• Kostomlatica (22)
• Kostroševci (81)
• Kostur (311)
• Kosuriće (125)
• Kotešica (727)
• Kotraža (304)
• Kotraža (889)
• Kotroman (182)
• Kovanica (190)
• Kovanluk (266)
• Kovanluk (2133)
• Kovačeva Bara (167)
• Kovačevac (235)
• Kovačevac (1613)
• Kovačevac (4349)
• Kovačevo (243)
• Kovači (1297)
• Kovači (283)
• Kovači (259)
• Kovačica (6764)
• Kovačice (203)
• Kovilj (5599)
• Kovilje (15)
• Kovilovo (411)
• Kovilovo  (1039)
• Kovin (14250)
• Kovioci (156)
• Kovizla (59)
• Kozare (362)
• Kozarica (213)
• Kozelj (476)
• Kozilo (8)
• Kozja (76)
• Kozjak (1102)
• Kozličić (237)
• Koznica (148)
• Koznica (235)
• Koznik (27)
• Koćura (234)
• Kočane (1591)
• Kočetin (404)
• Kočine (107)
• Kočino Selo (952)
• Košarno (105)
• Koševi (393)
• Koševine (1049)
• Koštunići (660)
• Koželj (181)
• Kožetin (907)
• Kožince (105)
• Kožlje (618)
• Kožuar (708)
• Kragujevac (146373)
• Krajinoviće (91)
• Krajišnici (1048)
• Krajišnik (2241)
• Krajkovac (607)
• Kraljevci (1232)
• Kraljevo (930)
• Kraljevo (57411)
• Krasava (649)
• Krastavče (110)
• Kratovo (305)
• Kraviće (187)
• Kravlje  (430)
• Kravlji Do (355)
• Krćevac (775)
• Kremenica (29)
• Kremiće (62)
• Kremna (727)
• Krenta (137)
• Krepoljin (1696)
• Krežbinac  (547)
• Kriva Feja (870)
• Kriva Reka (519)
• Kriva Reka (102)
• Kriva Reka (1135)
• Krivaja (986)
• Krivaja (173)
• Krivaja (11)
• Krivaja (952)
• Krivača (429)
• Krivača (414)
• Krivača (171)
• Krivelj (1316)
• Krivi Del (198)
• Krivi Vir (549)
• Krnić (600)
• Krnja Jela (47)
• Krnjača (220)
• Krnjevo (4253)
• Krnješevci (1025)
• Krnji Grad (47)
• Krnule (1084)
• Krpejce (47)
• Krstac (576)
• Krstac (30)
• Krstićevo (24)
• Krtinska (1177)
• Krtok (39)
• Krupac (144)
• Krupac (1444)
• Krupaja (649)
• Krupanj (4912)
• Krušar (1546)
• Krušce  (879)
• Krušedol Prnjavor (277)
• Krušedol Selo (388)
• Kruševa Glava (135)
• Kruševac (57347)
• Kruševica (686)
• Kruševica (47)
• Kruševica (150)
• Kruševica (567)
• Kruševo (486)
• Kruševo (36)
• Krušje (332)
• Kruščica (474)
• Kruščica (989)
• Kruščić (2353)
• Krvavci (311)
• Krvavica (862)
• Krvije (499)
• Krće (337)
• Krćevac (775)
• Krčedin (2878)
• Krčmar (485)
• Krčmare (150)
• Kršanje (167)
• Krševica (486)
• Kršna Glava (221)
• Kržava (806)
• Kržince (257)
• Kucura (4663)
• Kudreš (193)
• Kujavica (244)
• Kukavica (20)
• Kukavica (535)
• Kukići (574)
• Kukljin (1794)
• Kukujevci (2252)
• Kukulovce (298)
• Kukurovići (66)
• Kula (699)
• Kula (19301)
• Kulina (731)
• Kulinovci (413)
• Kulpin (2976)
• Kumane (431)
• Kumane (3814)
• Kumanica (240)
• Kumanovo (38)
• Kumarevo (825)
• Kumarevo (283)
• Kunice (77)
• Kunovica  (101)
• Kunovo (532)
• Kupinik (349)
• Kupinince (134)
• Kupinovac (386)
• Kupinovo (67)
• Kupinovo (2047)
• Kupusina (267)
• Kupusina (2356)
• Kupuzište (317)
• Kurbalija (146)
• Kurići (108)
• Kurjače (964)
• Kuršumlija (13639)
• Kuršumlijska Banja (151)
• Kusa Vrana (166)
• Kusadak (5691)
• Kusić (1361)
• Kusiće (742)
• Kusovac (182)
• Kutleš (651)
• Kutlovac (180)
• Kutlovo (236)
• Kutlovo (37)
• Kuzmin (Sremska Mitrovica) (3391)
• Kuzmičevo (133)
• Kućane (117)
• Kućani (256)
• Kučajna (468)
• Kučevo (4506)
• Kučin (169)
• Kušiljevo (2569)
• Kušići (555)
• Kuštica (175)
• Kuštilj (806)

L
Labukovo (122)
• Ladovica (904)
• Lajkovac (1950)
• Lajkovac (3443)
• Lalinac  (1828)
• Lalinac (445)
• Lalince (150)
• Lalinci (309)
• Lalinovac (250)
• Lalić (1646)
• Landol (1068)
• Lanište (68)
• Lapotince (647)
• Lapovo (806)
• Lapovo (7422)
• Lasovo (358)
• Latkovac (474)
• Latković (443)
• Latvica (323)
• Laudonovac (24)
• Lazac (865)
• Lazarevac (114)
• Lazarevac (671)
• Lazarevac (23551)
• Lazarevo Selo  (160)
• Lazarevo (3308)
• Lazarica (1521)
• Laznica (2063)
• Laćarak (10893)
• Laćisled (821)
• Lađevci (1258)
• Lebane (10004)
• Lebet (102)
• Lebina  (715)
• Lece (347)
• Ledinci (1641)
• Lelić (568)
• Lelići (381)
• Lenovac (204)
• Leović (318)
• Lepaja (674)
• Lepena (137)
• Lepenac (932)
• Lepenica (734)
• Lepojević (362)
• Lepčince (125)
• Lesenovci (193)
• Leskova Bara (139)
• Leskova (335)
• Leskovac (294)
• Leskovac (770)
• Leskovac (390)
• Leskovac (128)
• Leskovac (63185)
• Leskovica (298)
• Leskovica (31)
• Leskovik  (300)
• Leskovik (24)
• Leskovo (431)
• Lesnica (159)
• Letovica (1126)
• Letovište (177)
• Leušići (162)
• Leva Reka (80)
• Levići (152)
• Levosoje (840)
• Levovik (162)
• Leča (319)
• Leševo (324)
• Lešje  (422)
• Lešnica (4731)
• Leštane (8492)
• Ležimir (947)
• Lijeva Reka (14)
• Likodra (874)
• Linovo (118)
• Lipar (1807)
• Lipe (15)
• Lipe (3338)
• Lipenović (603)
• Lipica (82)
• Liplje (372)
• Lipnica (567)
• Lipnica (974)
• Lipnica (621)
• Lipnički Šor (2673)
• Lipolist (2582)
• Lipova (955)
• Lipovac (418)
• Lipovac (304)
• Lipovac (345)
• Lipovac (298)
• Lipovac (558)
• Lipovac (79)
• Lipovica (450)
• Lipovica (147)
• Lipovica (1287)
• Lipovica (454)
• Lis (257)
• Lisa (1113)
• Lisice (383)
• Lisina (52)
• Liso Polje (278)
• Lisović (1057)
• Livađe (174)
• Ličin Dol (139)
• Ličje (414)
• Loboder (53)
• Lojanice (641)
• Lok (1255)
• Lokva (69)
• Lokve (2002)
• Lomnica (186)
• Lomnica (1033)
• Lonjin (337)
• Lončanik (551)
• Lopardince (825)
• Lopatanj (1330)
• Lopatnica (303)
• Lopaš (571)
• Lopaš (800)
• Lopušnik (463)
• Lopužnje (70)
• Loret (265)
• Lovci (861)
• Lovci (228)
• Lovćenac (3693)
• Lozan (210)
• Lozane (49)
• Lozanj (340)
• Lozna (380)
• Loznac (176)
• Loznica (660)
• Loznica (401)
• Loznica (19863)
• Lozničko Polje (7922)
• Lozno (133)
• Lozovik (328)
• Lozovik (5607)
• Loćika (380)
• Loćika (519)
• Ločevci (90)
• Lubnica (1052)
• Lug (2555)
• Lug (801)
• Lugare (389)
• Lugavčina (3384)
• Luka (612)
• Lukar (139)
• Lukarce (31)
• Lukare (489)
• Lukarsko Goševo (850)
• Lukavac (287)
• Lukavac (1054)
• Lukavica (429)
• Lukavica (455)
• Lukavica (242)
• Luke (1037)
• Lukino Selo (598)
• Lukićevo (2077)
• Lukocrevo (186)
• Lukomir (960)
• Lukovica (778)
• Lukovo (704)
• Lukovo (366)
• Lukovo (38)
• Lukovo (277)
• Lukovo (200)
• Lunjevac (607)
• Lunjevica (512)
• Lučane (1091)
• Lučani (328)
• Lučani (4309)
• Lučica (2192)
• Lučice (169)
• Lučina (927)
• Lužane (942)
• Lužnice (1065)

Lj
Ljanik (29)
• Ljepojevići (126)
• Ljevaja (115)
• Lješnica (236)
• Lještansko (418)
• Ljig (2979)
• Ljiljance (535)
• Ljuba (559)
• Ljubanje (708)
• Ljubatovica (87)
• Ljubava (525)
• Ljuberađa (287)
• Ljubinci (323)
• Ljubinić (855)
• Ljubinje (409)
• Ljubić (385)
• Ljubić (61)
• Ljubičevac (458)
• Ljubičevac (83)
• Ljubiš (705)
• Ljubovija (4130)
• Ljukovo (1604)
• Ljuljaci (369)
• Ljupten (408)
• Ljutaje (88)
• Ljutež (281)
• Ljutice (593)
• Ljutice (432)
• Ljutova (37)
• Ljutovnica (190)
• Ljutovo (1181)
• Ljuša (109)

M
Magaš (204)
• Maglić (2695)
• Maglič (45)
• Magovo (24)
• Majdan (513)
• Majdan (292)
• Majdanpek (10071)
• Majdevo (491)
• Majilovac (1024)
• Majinović (163)
• Majkovac (23)
• Majur (2777)
• Majur (6854)
• Makce (975)
• Makovište (893)
• Makrešane (1618)
• Makvište (24)
• Mala Biljanica (207)
• Mala Bosna (1245)
• Mala Braina (13)
• Mala Bresnica (135)
• Mala Draguša (157)
• Mala Drenova (735)
• Mala Grabovnica (182)
• Mala Grabovnica (275)
• Mala Ivanča (1701)
• Mala Jasikova (332)
• Mala Ježevica (304)
• Mala Kamenica (392)
• Mala Kopašnica (255)
• Mala Kosanica (130)
• Mala Krsna (1753)
• Mala Kruševica (317)
• Mala Moštanica (1665)
• Mala Plana (608)
• Mala Plana (887)
• Mala Reka (489)
• Mala Reka (174)
• Mala Reka (21)
• Mala Remeta (151)
• Mala Sugubina (333)
• Mala Vranjska (801)
• Mala Vrbica (783)
• Mala Vrbica (249)
• Mala Vrbica (368)
• Mala Vrbnica (223)
• Mala Vrbnica (262)
• Malajnica (683)
• Male Pijace (1988)
• Maletina (188)
• Maleševo (291)
• Maleševo (146)
• Mali Beograd (524)
• Mali Borak (489)
• Mali Bošnjak (300)
• Mali Crljeni (885)
• Mali Drenovac (176)
• Mali Izvor (565)
• Mali Izvor (454)
• Mali Iđoš (5465)
• Mali Jasenovac (284)
• Mali Jovanovac (144)
• Mali Krčimir (256)
• Mali Kupci (407)
• Mali Pesak (115)
• Mali Popović (445)
• Mali Požarevac (1479)
• Mali Radinci (598)
• Mali Suvodol (281)
• Mali Trnovac (343)
• Mali Vrtop (150)
• Mali Zvornik (4736)
• Mali Šenj (100)
• Mali Šiljegovac (657)
• Mali Žam (379)
• Maljević (341)
• Maljurevac (548)
• Malo Bavanište (420)
• Malo Bonjince (115)
• Malo Crniće (882)
• Malo Golovode (2369)
• Malo Gradište (377)
• Malo Krušince (145)
• Malo Krčmare (486)
• Malo Laole (635)
• Malo Orašje (1139)
• Malo Središte (120)
• Malo Vojlovce (208)
• Malošište (2933)
• Malča  (1202)
• Mana (227)
• Manajle (60)
• Manastir (2)
• Manastirica (250)
• Manastirica (748)
• Manić (551)
• Manjak (641)
• Manjinac (122)
• Manojlica (272)
• Manojlovce (778)
• Manojlovci (144)
• Manđelos (1533)
• Maovi (717)
• Maradik (2298)
• Marenovo (453)
• Margance (38)
• Margance (20)
• Margita (1047)
• Marina Kutina (347)
• Marinovac (305)
• Maričiće (54)
• Markova Crkva (110)
• Markovac (674)
• Markovac (3228)
• Markovac (329)
• Markovica (193)
• Markoviće (52)
• Markovićevo (216)
• Marovac (123)
• Martinci (3639)
• Martonoš (2183)
• Maršić (294)
• Maskar, Topola (236)
• Maskare (539)
• Maskova (254)
• Masloševo (478)
• Masurica (1245)
• Masurovci (28)
• Matarova (83)
• Mataruge (383)
• Mataruge (164)
• Mataruška Banja (2732)
• Matijevac (750)
• Mazarać (197)
• Mazgoš (27)
• Maćedonce (81)
• Maćedonce (236)
• Maćija (126)
• Mačevac (217)
• Mačina (67)
• Mačja Stena (29)
• Mačkat (806)
• Mačkatica (259)
• Mačkovac (1295)
• Mačkovac (298)
• Mačvanska Mitrovica (3896)
• Mačvanski Metković (1244)
• Mačvanski Pričinović (1976)
• Mačvanski Prnjavor (4464)
• Mađare (174)
• Mađer (153)
• Mađere (363)
• Mađere (525)
• Mašoviće (119)
• Mažići (261)
• Medare (384)
• Medevce (82)
• Medojevac (165)
• Medovine (163)
• Medoševac  (2704)
• Medoševac (925)
• Medveđa (880)
• Medveđa (2694)
• Medveđa (2810)
• Medveđica (44)
• Mehane (54)
• Mehovine (615)
• Mekiš (1137)
• Melaje (431)
• Melenci (6737)
• Meljak (1772)
• Meljanica (163)
• Melnica (924)
• Melovo (63)
• Merdare (139)
• Merdželat (147)
• Merovac (174)
• Merošina (873)
• Merćez (26)
• Mesarci (592)
• Mesić (227)
• Metikoš (688)
• Metlić (1190)
• Metovnica (1331)
• Metriš (392)
• Mezdraja (33)
• Mezgraja  (575)
• Mezgraja (57)
• Mečji Do (44)
• Mečkovac (169)
• Međa (872)
• Međa (1155)
• Međani (80)
• Međugor (176)
• Međuhana (187)
• Međulužje (2431)
• Međureč (430)
• Međurečje (156)
• Međurečje (98)
• Međuvršje (82)
• Meševo (626)
• Mihajlovac (718)
• Mihajlovac (3093)
• Mihajlovo (1004)
• Mijajlica (190)
• Mijajlovac (548)
• Mijakovce (37)
• Mijani (25)
• Mijatovac (1712)
• Mijači (193)
• Mijoska (750)
• Mijovce (67)
• Mikulovac (385)
• Milakovac (593)
• Milakovići (66)
• Milanovac (445)
• Milanovo (546)
• Milanovo (273)
• Milatkoviće (161)
• Milatovac (584)
• Milatovac (828)
• Milatovići (760)
• Milavac (223)
• Milavčići (432)
• Milentija (184)
• Miletićevo (622)
• Milevci (140)
• Mileševo (121)
• Mileševo (1118)
• Miliješ (644)
• Milina (228)
• Miliva (1059)
• Milivojce (122)
• Miliće (293)
• Milićevci (944)
• Milićevo Selo (694)
• Milići (38)
• Miličinica (913)
• Miljević (527)
• Miljevići (455)
• Miljkovac  (253)
• Miljkovac (50)
• Miljkovac (154)
• Miljkovica (62)
• Milojkovac (7)
• Milorci (407)
• Miločaj (1085)
• Milošev Do (126)
• Miloševac (3426)
• Miloševac (95)
• Miloševo (1229)
• Miloševo (517)
• Milutinovac (186)
• Milutovac (1917)
• Milušinac (382)
• Minićevo (828)
• Miokovci (1063)
• Miokus (406)
• Mionica (184)
• Mionica (1446)
• Mionica (1723)
• Miranovac (43)
• Miranovačka Kula (17)
• Miratovac (2774)
• Miraševac (742)
• Mirijevo (474)
• Mirilovac  (835)
• Mirkovci (20)
• Mirnica (60)
• Mironić (99)
• Mirosaljci (847)
• Mirosaljci (1658)
• Mirovo (183)
• Miroč (406)
• Miroševce (1053)
• Misača (781)
• Mislođin (2313)
• Mitrova (996)
• Mićunovo (516)
• Mišar (2217)
• Mišević (233)
• Miševići (112)
• Mišićevo (446)
• Mišljenovac (465)
• Miščiće (231)
• Mladenovac (1539)
• Mladenovac (22114)
• Mladenovo (3358)
• Mlanča (260)
• Mlačište (29)
• Mlekominci (124)
• Modra Stena (257)
• Modrica (764)
• Mojinci (34)
• Mojković (790)
• Mojsinje (36)
• Mojsinje (869)
• Moklište (492)
• Mokra (315)
• Mokra Gora (605)
• Mokranje (710)
• Mokrin (5918)
• Mol (Serbia) (6786)
• Molovin (298)
• Morani (198)
• Moravac (1785)
• Moravci (665)
• Moravski Bujmir (207)
• Morović (2164)
• Mosna (787)
• Motrić (175)
• Mozgovo (1632)
• Močioci (143)
• Mošorin (2763)
• Moštanica (442)
• Mramor  (725)
• Mramorac (613)
• Mramorak (3145)
• Mramorski Potok  (312)
• Mramorsko Brdo (67)
• Mratišić (345)
• Mrkonje (44)
• Mrkovica (14)
• Mrljak (26)
• Mrmoš (802)
• Mrovska (508)
• Mrsać (1350)
• Mrtvica (380)
• Mrveš (116)
• Mrzenica (221)
• Mrčajevci (2676)
• Mrče (93)
• Mrčić (192)
• Mrčići (297)
• Mrčkovac (328)
• Mrčkovina (33)
• Mrđenovac (697)
• Mršelj (164)
• Mršelji (219)
• Mršinci (1359)
• Mrštane (1431)
• Mudrakovac (3366)
• Muhovac (570)
• Muhovo (545)
• Mur (3407)
• Mure (148)
• Murgaš (559)
• Musina Reka (274)
• Mustapić (740)
• Musulj (125)
• Mutanj (104)
• Muzaće (152)
• Mučibaba (110)
• Mušići (433)
• Muškovina (34)
• Mušvete (277)
• Mužinac (459)

N
Naboje (218)
• Nabrđe (346)
• Nadalj (2202)
• Nadrlje (229)
• Nadumce (161)
• Nakovo (2419)
• Nakrivanj (1315)
• Nakučani (123)
• Nakučani (640)
• Namga (189)
• Nanomir (239)
• Nastavce (52)
• Natalinci (834)
• Naupare (580)
• Navalin (898)
• Nazarica (76)
• Našuškovica (295)
• Negbina (475)
• Negosavlje (426)
• Negotin (17758)
• Negotinac (26)
• Negovac (39)
• Negrišori (549)
• Nemenikuće (2058)
• Nepričava (679)
• Neradin (551)
• Neresnica (2365)
• Nesalce (1203)
• Nesvrta (128)
• Nesvrta (132)
• Neuzina (1371)
• Nevada (30)
• Nevade (549)
• Neštin (900)
• Nikinci (2216)
• Nikojevići (416)
• Nikola Tesla (3532)
• Nikolinac (418)
• Nikolinci (1240)
• Nikoličevo (833)
• Nikšić (148)
• Niš  (173724)
• Niševac (523)
• Niška Banja (4437)
• Nišor (162)
• Nomanica (317)
• Norča (992)
• Nosoljin (260)
• Nova Božurna (239)
• Nova Brezovica (125)
• Nova Crnja (1861)
• Nova Crvenka (524)
• Nova Gajdobra (1409)
• Nova Pazova (18214)
• Nova Topola (121)
• Nova Varoš (10335)
• Novaci (402)
• Novaci (879)
• Novi Banovci (9358)
• Novi Bečej (14452)
• Novi Bračin (568)
• Novi Glog (137)
• Novi Itebej (1315)
• Novi Karlovci (3036)
• Novi Kneževac (7581)
• Novi Kozarci (2277)
• Novi Kozjak (768)
• Novi Milanovac (406)
• Novi Pazar (54604)
• Novi Sad (191405)
• Novi Sip (909)
• Novi Slankamen (3455)
• Novi Zavoj (1458)
• Novi Đurovac (13)
• Novi Žednik (2848)
• Novo Korito (208)
• Novo Lanište (694)
• Novo Miloševo (6763)
• Novo Momčilovo (85)
• Novo Orahovo (2029)
• Novo Selo (46)
• Novo Selo (47)
• Novo Selo (211)
• Novo Selo (75)
• Novo Selo (207)
• Novo Selo (120)
• Novo Selo (1404)
• Novo Selo (362)
• Novo Selo (351)
• Novo Selo (56)
• Novo Selo (87)
• Novo Selo (145)
• Novo Selo (1256)
• Novo Selo (106)
• Novo Selo (3952)
• Nozrina (743)
• Noćaj (2120)
• Noćaje (77)

Nj
Njegoševo (632)

O
Obajgora (834)
• Obilić (94)
• Oblačina (443)
• Oblička Sena (52)
• Obornjača (389)
• Obradovce (31)
• Obražda (34)
• Obrenovac (143)
• Obrenovac (23620)
• Obrež (1400)
• Obrež (3221)
• Obrovac (3177)
• Obrtince (14)
• Obrva (720)
• Odojeviće (50)
• Odžaci (1562)
• Odžaci (9940)
• Ogar (1143)
• Oglađenovac (636)
• Oholje (179)
• Ojkovica (290)
• Okletac (622)
• Okolište (141)
• Okose (36)
• Okruglica (226)
• Okruglica (261)
• Omoljica  (6518)
• Opaljenik (273)
• Oparić (963)
• Oplanić (456)
• Oplanići (911)
• Opornica (452)
• Opovo (4693)
• Orahovo (34)
• Orane (152)
• Oraovac (336)
• Oraovica (152)
• Oraovica (2210)
• Oraovica (3774)
• Orašac (1462)
• Orašac (582)
• Orašac (707)
• Orašac (204)
• Orašac (404)
• Oraše (455)
• Orašje (698)
• Orašje (934)
• Oreovac  (370)
• Oreovac (54)
• Oreovica (128)
• Oreovica (862)
• Orešac (335)
• Orešac (420)
• Oreškovica (911)
• Orešković (696)
• Orid (192)
• Orlja Glava (131)
• Orlja (75)
• Orljane (1612)
• Orlje (255)
• Orljevo (260)
• Orlovac (17)
• Orlovat (1789)
• Orom (1561)
• Orovička Planina (201)
• Oruglica (173)
• Osanica (1187)
• Osaonica (284)
• Osaonica (37)
• Osečenica (795)
• Osečina  (944)
• Osečina (3172)
• Osipaonica (4071)
• Osladić (592)
• Oslare (904)
• Osmakova (292)
• Osnić (1340)
• Osoje (966)
• Osoje (526)
• Osonica (860)
• Osredci (474)
• Ostatovica (83)
• Ostojićevo (2844)
• Ostra (1091)
• Ostra Glava (72)
• Ostrc (128)
• Ostrikovac (574)
• Ostrovica (603)
• Ostrovica (40)
• Ostrovica (39)
• Ostrovo (685)
• Ostrovo (300)
• Ostrozub (1)
• Ostružanj  (588)
• Otanj (412)
• Otroci (543)
• Ovsinjinac (237)
• Ovsište (630)
• Ovča  (2567)
• Ovčar Banja (168)
• Ovčinja (582)
• Ozrem (343)
• Očage (409)
• Ošljane (256)
• Oštra Stijena (123)
• Oštrelj (654)

P
Padej (2882)
• Padež (58)
• Padež (877)
• Padina (5760)
• Padina (370)
• Padinska Skela  (9836)
• Pajazitovo (241)
• Pajež (90)
• Pajkovac (142)
• Pajsak (84)
• Pajsijević (545)
• Pakašnica (1929)
• Pakleštica (56)
• Paklje (120)
• Pakovraće (483)
• Paležnica (224)
• Paligrace  (353)
• Palikuća (387)
• Palilula (75)
• Palić (7745)
• Palja (18)
• Paljane (535)
• Paljevo (369)
• Paljevštica (56)
• Paljina  (272)
• Paljuvi (769)
• Palojce (484)
• Pambukovica (1173)
• Panevlje (209)
• Panjak (109)
• Panjevac (292)
• Panjevac (519)
• Pankovo (416)
• Panojeviće (184)
• Panonija (798)
• Pančevo  (77087)
• Papiće (276)
• Papratište (291)
• Papratna (13)
• Parada (16)
• Parage (1039)
• Paralovo (133)
• Paralovo (982)
• Paramun (80)
• Paraćin  (25292)
• Parcane (542)
• Parcani (657)
• Pardik (385)
• Parmenac (240)
• Parta (444)
• Parunovac (2179)
• Parčin (266)
• Pasi Poljana  (2139)
• Pasjak (312)
• Pasjač (32)
• Pasjača (35)
• Pasjača  (295)
• Pasji Potok (42)
• Paskašija (11)
• Paskovac (687)
• Paune (596)
• Pavlica (156)
• Pavličina (40)
• Pavliš (2237)
• Pavlje (178)
• Pavlovac (70)
• Pavlovac (878)
• Pavlovci (460)
• Pačarađa (41)
• Pačir (2948)
• Pašinac (134)
• Paštrić (588)
• Pear (433)
• Pecka  (501)
• Pejinović (235)
• Pejkovac (1276)
• Pekčanica (309)
• Pepelj (180)
• Pepeljevac (2101)
• Pepeljevac (15)
• Pepeljevac (733)
• Periš (220)
• Perlez (3818)
• Pertate (1559)
• Perunika (64)
• Perutina (204)
• Perućac (845)
• Pestiš (22)
• Petačinci (19)
• Petina (353)
• Petka (1191)
• Petka (1285)
• Petkovica (967)
• Petlovača (1521)
• Petnica (241)
• Petnica (614)
• Petrijevo (1093)
• Petrilje (63)
• Petrlaš (33)
• Petropolje (286)
• Petrovac (47)
• Petrovac (108)
• Petrovac (389)
• Petrovac (436)
• Petrovac (13)
• Petrovac na Mlavi (7851)
• Petrovaradin (13973)
• Petrovo Polje (22)
• Petrovo Selo (129)
• Petrovčić (1406)
• Petruša (120)
• Pevaštica (35)
• Pećinci (2659)
• Pečanica (453)
• Pečenjevce (1776)
• Pečeno (125)
• Pečenog (460)
• Pilareta (26)
• Pilatovići (803)
• Pilica (653)
• Pinosava (2839)
• Pirkovac (34)
• Piroman (1008)
• Pirot (40678)
• Piskalje (30)
• Piskanja (486)
• Piskopovce (162)
• Piskupovo (216)
• Pivnice (3835)
• Plana  (1244)
• Plana (39)
• Plana (37)
• Plandište (4270)
• Planina (204)
• Planinica (8)
• Planinica (313)
• Planinica (18)
• Planinica (198)
• Planinica (305)
• Plaskovac (559)
• Platičevo (2760)
• Plavce (296)
• Plavkovo (99)
• Plavna (1392)
• Plavna (953)
• Plašće (85)
• Plažane (1541)
• Plenibabe (123)
• Pleš (403)
• Plešin (222)
• Pljakovo (78)
• Ploča (400)
• Ploča (100)
• Ploča (945)
• Pločica (2044)
• Pločnik (182)
• Pločnik (593)
• Plužac  (460)
• Plužina (370)
• Pobeda (342)
• Pobrđe (2176)
• Pobrđe (972)
• Pocerski Metković (857)
• Pocerski Pričinović (5992)
• Pocesje (54)
• Poda (17)
• Podgorac (2218)
• Podgorac (516)
• Podina (798)
• Podlokanj (217)
• Podnemić (420)
• Podrimce (283)
• Podunavci (1446)
• Podvis (369)
• Podvrška (1143)
• Poganovo (77)
• Pogled (627)
• Pojate (986)
• Pokrevenik (126)
• Pokrvenik (11)
• Pokrvenik (276)
• Polatna (281)
• Poljaci (393)
• Poljana (1610)
• Poljane (455)
• Poljanice (544)
• Poljna (1214)
• Poljska Ržana (1349)
• Polokce (117)
• Polom (275)
• Polom (440)
• Polumir (309)
• Pomijača (201)
• Ponikovica (362)
• Ponikve (97)
• Ponor (144)
• Ponor (379)
• Ponorac (186)
• Popadić (773)
• Pope (83)
• Pope (79)
• Popina (384)
• Popinci (1360)
• Popiće (314)
• Popova (224)
• Popovac  (2588)
• Popovac  (805)
• Popovac (190)
• Popovce (379)
• Popovci (92)
• Popovica (487)
• Popović (412)
• Popović (1545)
• Popovići (300)
• Popovnjak (337)
• Popučke (2607)
• Popšica (155)
• Porodin (154)
• Porodin (2036)
• Poroštica (113)
• Poroštica (41)
• Poružnica (354)
• Poskurice (573)
• Poslon (264)
• Postenje (383)
• Postenje (3471)
• Potkrš (124)
• Potok (282)
• Potočac  (1309)
• Potočanje (518)
• Potočić (449)
• Potpeće (512)
• Potporanj (311)
• Potreb (267)
• Potrkanje (83)
• Pozlata (125)
• Počekovina (838)
• Požarevac (41736)
• Požega (523)
• Požega (13206)
• Požegrmac (188)
• Požeženo (799)
• Požežina (251)
• Prahovo (1506)
• Pralja (17)
• Pranjani (1786)
• Pranjci (360)
• Praskovče (511)
• Pravoševo (85)
• Prača (2)
• Prebreza (329)
• Predejane (491)
• Predejane (1222)
• Predole (170)
• Predvorica (469)
• Prekadin (167)
• Prekašnica (23)
• Prekodolce (1625)
• Prekonoga (578)
• Prekonozi (173)
• Prekopeča (123)
• Prekopuce (125)
• Prekopčelica (508)
• Prekorađe (22)
• Preljina (1801)
• Premeća (320)
• Preobraženje (69)
• Preseka (268)
• Preseka (520)
• Presečina (448)
• Preslap (251)
• Pretežana (114)
• Pretina (53)
• Pretoke (577)
• Pretrešnja (150)
• Pretrkovac (326)
• Prevalac (153)
• Prevetica (21)
• Prevešt (338)
• Preševo (13426)
• Prhovo (813)
• Priboj (642)
• Priboj (392)
• Priboj (19564)
• Pribojska Goleša (204)
• Pribojske Čelice (142)
• Pribovce (348)
• Pridoli (334)
• Pridvorica (124)
• Pridvorica (951)
• Pridvorica (227)
• Pridvorica (208)
• Pridvorice (870)
• Prigrevica (4781)
• Prijanovići (446)
• Prijepolje (15031)
• Prijevor (1576)
• Prijezdić (340)
• Prilepac (499)
• Prilike (1395)
• Prilipac (341)
• Prisjan (143)
• Prislonica (1591)
• Privina Glava (221)
• Pričevac (54)
• Pričević (519)
• Prkosava (317)
• Prlita (142)
• Prnjavor (186)
• Prnjavor (107)
• Prnjavor (318)
• Progar (1455)
• Progorelica (902)
• Progoreoci (1015)
• Prokuplje (27673)
• Prolesje (67)
• Prolom (111)
• Prosek (600)
• Protopopinci (55)
• Provaljenik (202)
• Provo (2355)
• Proštinac (254)
• Prugovac (318)
• Prugovo (774)
• Pružanj (202)
• Pružatovac (835)
• Prva Kutina (1900)
• Prvonek (203)
• Prćenova (159)
• Prćilovica (2410)
• Pržojne (52)
• Pudarci (1410)
• Puhovac (482)
• Puhovo (676)
• Pukovac (3956)
• Pusta Tušimlja (53)
• Pusto Šilovo (74)
• Pustovlah (28)
• Putinci (3244)
• Putnikovo (243)
• Pšanik (219)

R
Rabas (150)
• Rabe (135)
• Rabenovac (128)
• Rabrovac (1400)
• Rabrovo (1219)
• Radalj (2497)
• Radaljevo (1010)
• Radaljica (152)
• Radanovci (531)
• Radejna (87)
• Radenka (803)
• Radenkovac (114)
• Radenković (1086)
• Radevce (493)
• Radevce (94)
• Radijevići (169)
• Radikina Bara (65)
• Radinac (4920)
• Radinjinci (288)
• Radinovac (75)
• Radičevac (59)
• Radičevci (164)
• Radičević (1332)
• Radljevo (607)
• Radmanovo (132)
• Radmilović (260)
• Radmirovac (200)
• Radobić (327)
• Radobuđa (387)
• Radoinja (690)
• Radojevo (1385)
• Radonjica (903)
• Radosinj (71)
• Radovanje (689)
• Radovašnica (238)
• Radovci (429)
• Radovnica (998)
• Radoševac (222)
• Radoševac (261)
• Radoševo (370)
• Radošin (550)
• Radošiće (224)
• Raduhovce (402)
• Radujevac (1540)
• Radunje (87)
• Raduša (90)
• Raduša (297)
• Raduša (524)
• Rafuna (131)
• Ragodeš (234)
• Rajac (436)
• Rajac (355)
• Rajetiće (63)
• Rajinac (233)
• Rajince (1954)
• Rajkinac (495)
• Rajkovac (1639)
• Rajkovac (189)
• Rajković (350)
• Rajkoviće (29)
• Rajno Polje (739)
• Rajčetine (33)
• Rajčevce (11)
• Rajčilovci (1817)
• Rajčinoviće (537)
• Rajčinovićka Trnava (208)
• Rakari (513)
• Rakinac (1100)
• Rakita (340)
• Rakitovo (1729)
• Raklja (651)
• Rakov Dol (18)
• Rakova Bara (464)
• Rakova (778)
• Rakovac (977)
• Rakovac (21)
• Rakovac (240)
• Rakovac (1989)
• Rakovica (108)
• Ralja (1537)
• Ralja (2858)
• Raljin (50)
• Ram (294)
• Ramaća (340)
• Ramoševo (238)
• Ranatovce (65)
• Ranilović (1685)
• Rankova Reka (22)
• Ranovac (1779)
• Ranutovac (490)
• Rasna (1026)
• Rasnica (391)
• Rasno (410)
• Rasno (401)
• Raspoganče (132)
• Rast (51)
• Rastenoviće (145)
• Rastina (566)
• Rastište (473)
• Rastovnica (69)
• Rataje (620)
• Ratajska (2088)
• Ratare  (610)
• Ratari (603)
• Ratari (2035)
• Ratina (2715)
• Ratkovac (378)
• Ratković (461)
• Ratkovo (4118)
• Rautovo (35)
• Ravanica (784)
• Ravna Banja (364)
• Ravna Dubrava (450)
• Ravna Gora (105)
• Ravna Gora (151)
• Ravna Reka (380)
• Ravna Reka (167)
• Ravna (252)
• Ravnaja (323)
• Ravni (190)
• Ravni (558)
• Ravni Del (78)
• Ravni Del (183)
• Ravni Do (102)
• Ravni Topolovac (1352)
• Ravni Šort (51)
• Ravnište (95)
• Ravnište (131)
• Ravnje (1463)
• Ravnje (245)
• Ravno Bučje (393)
• Ravno Bučje (28)
• Ravno Selo (3478)
• Razbojna (479)
• Razgojna (904)
• Rača (672)
• Rača (247)
• Rača (1313)
• Rača (2744)
• Rađevo Selo (929)
• Rašanac (815)
• Raševica  (1215)
• Rašica (183)
• Raška (6619)
• Rašković (226)
• Raškoviće (164)
• Ražanj (1537)
• Raždaginja (418)
• Rdovo (136)
• Rebelj (136)
• Reka (278)
• Reka (166)
• Rekovac (1930)
• Reljan (694)
• Reljinac (611)
• Reljinci (244)
• Repince (972)
• Repište (344)
• Resavica (2365)
• Resavica (159)
• Resen (81)
• Resinac (224)
• Resnik (158)
• Resnik (1147)
• Resnik (857)
• Retkocer (96)
• Rečica (148)
• Rečica (45)
• Rečica (518)
• Rečica (773)
• Rečice (265)
• Rečka (469)
• Reževiće (104)
• Rgaje (26)
• Rgotina (1721)
• Rgošte (319)
• Ribarci (39)
• Ribare (3165)
• Ribare (697)
• Ribare (296)
• Ribare (485)
• Ribari (356)
• Ribari (2131)
• Ribarice (407)
• Ribariće (885)
• Ribarska Banja (277)
• Ribaševina (484)
• Ribnica (2779)
• Ribnice (471)
• Ribnik (304)
• Rikačevo (109)
• Riljac (730)
• Ripanj (10741)
• Ristovac (342)
• Ritiševo (509)
• Ritopek (2284)
• Ritošići (228)
• Rivica (657)
• Riđage (230)
• Riđake (427)
• Riđevštica (515)
• Riđica (2590)
• Rlica (41)
• Roanda (572)
• Robaje (511)
• Rogavčina (214)
• Rogača (334)
• Rogača (1046)
• Rogačica (768)
• Roge (424)
• Rogljevo (183)
• Rogojevac (404)
• Rokci (213)
• Rokci (480)
• Ropočevo (2363)
• Rosica (241)
• Rosići (316)
• Rosomač (60)
• Rovine (109)
• Rovni (169)
• Roćevac (356)
• Roćevići (405)
• Rošci (489)
• Rožanci (523)
• Rožanstvo (457)
• Roždace (47)
• Rožina (753)
• Rsavci (399)
• Rsovac (395)
• Rsovci (183)
• Rtanj (182)
• Rtari (282)
• Rti (553)
• Rtkovo (1012)
• Rubribreza (811)
• Ruda Bukva (118)
• Rudare (246)
• Rudare (551)
• Rudenice (164)
• Rudine (159)
• Rudinje (217)
• Rudna Glava (2309)
• Rudnica (300)
• Rudnica (74)
• Rudnik (1706)
• Rudnjak (278)
• Rudno (302)
• Rudovci (1787)
• Rujevac (522)
• Rujevica (260)
• Rujišnik (559)
• Rujište (470)
• Rujište (413)
• Rujkovac (267)
• Rujnik  (569)
• Ruklada (372)
• Ruma (32229)
• Rumenka (5729)
• Rumska (911)
• Runjani (2525)
• Rupeljevo (451)
• Ruplje (6)
• Rusce (37)
• Rusce (73)
• Ruski Krstur (5213)
• Rusko Selo (3328)
• Rusna (516)
• Rutevac (1094)
• Rutoši (887)
• Ručići (144)
• Ruđa (103)
• Ruđinci (2019)
• Ružić (181)
• Rvati (1211)
• Rvati (687)
• Rđavica (40)
• Ržanica (317)

S
Sagonjevo (118)
• Sainovina (810)
• Sajan (1348)
• Sakar (504)
• Sakule (2048)
• Salakovac (768)
• Salaš Crnobarski (1344)
• Salaš Noćajski (1879)
• Salaš (962)
• Samaila (1636)
• Samarinovac (464)
• Samarinovac (756)
• Samarnica (132)
• Samokovo (61)
• Samoljica (893)
• Samoš (1247)
• Sanad (1314)
• Sandalj (155)
• Sanković (239)
• Saranovo (1241)
• Saraorci (2413)
• Sastav Reka (40)
• Savinac (41)
• Savinac (365)
• Savino Selo (3351)
• Savković (321)
• Savovo (166)
• Saš (42)
• Sebevranje (136)
• Sebečevac (546)
• Sebečevo (897)
• Sebimilje (126)
• Sebrat (105)
• Sedlare (690)
• Sedlari (1313)
• Sedobro (322)
• Sefer (57)
• Sefkerin (2627)
• Sejace (246)
• Sekicol (57)
• Sekirača (29)
• Sekurič (816)
• Selačka (275)
• Selenac (485)
• Selenča (3279)
• Seleuš (1340)
• Selevac (3864)
• Selište (24)
• Selište (16)
• Selište (928)
• Selište (453)
• Seljane (168)
• Seljašnica (774)
• Selova (180)
• Semedraž (264)
• Semegnjevo (300)
• Semeteš (152)
• Semče (309)
• Sena (232)
• Senaja (444)
• Seništa (262)
• Senje (1468)
• Senjski Rudnik (595)
• Senokos (44)
• Senta (20302)
• Seoce (115)
• Seone (994)
• Sepci (673)
• Sesalac (347)
• Severni Kočarnik (821)
• Severovo (294)
• Sevojno (7445)
• Sezemče (250)
• Seča Reka (853)
• Sečanica  (872)
• Sečanj (2647)
• Sibač (544)
• Sibnica (243)
• Sibnica (234)
• Sibnica (686)
• Sibnica (407)
• Sibnica (470)
• Sige (704)
• Siget (247)
• Sijarina (359)
• Sijarinska Banja (568)
• Sijerač (201)
• Sikirica  (1038)
• Sikirje (153)
• Sikole (838)
• Silbaš (2849)
• Siljevica (165)
• Simino Brdo (244)
• Simićevo (1465)
• Sinja Glava (138)
• Sinjac (241)
• Sinji Vir  (251)
• Sinošević (918)
• Sinoševići (200)
• Siokovac (381)
• Sipić (507)
• Sirakovo (894)
• Sirdija  (330)
• Sirig (3010)
• Sirogojno (763)
• Sirča (1347)
• Sisevac  (18)
• Sitarice (178)
• Sitniče (778)
• Sivac (8992)
• Sivčina (252)
• Sićevo (1007)
• Sjenica (13161)
• Sjeverin (337)
• Skadar  (736)
• Skakavci (274)
• Skela (1855)
• Skobalj (241)
• Skobalj (1880)
• Skokuće (105)
• Skorenovac (2574)
• Skorica (958)
• Skradnik (2)
• Skrapež (215)
• Skrađani (454)
• Skrobnica (178)
• Skrvenica (32)
• Skržuti (667)
• Skukovo (23)
• Skupljen (1030)
• Sladaja (788)
• Sladinac (191)
• Slanci  (1770)
• Slankamenački Vinogradi (266)
• Slatina (921)
• Slatina (228)
• Slatina (124)
• Slatina (104)
• Slatina (639)
• Slatina (214)
• Slatina (479)
• Slatina (297)
• Slatina (138)
• Slatina (254)
• Slatina (413)
• Slatina (629)
• Slatina (251)
• Slavinja (49)
• Slavkovica (741)
• Slavnik (127)
• Slavujevac (482)
• Slavujevce (431)
• Slepčević (1714)
• Slivje (130)
• Slivnica (18)
• Slivnica (143)
• Slišane (245)
• Slovac (307)
• Smederevo (62805)
• Smederevska Palanka (25300)
• Smedovac (163)
• Smiljevac (165)
• Smiljević (83)
• Smilov Laz (8)
• Smilovac (1052)
• Smilovci (163)
• Smoljinac (1873)
• Smoluća (294)
• Smrdan (155)
• Smrdan (95)
• Smrdić (381)
• Snegotin (201)
• Soderce (326)
• Sokobanja (8407)
• Sokolac (104)
• Sokolići (182)
• Sokolovo (623)
• Solačka Sena (162)
• Solotuša (1066)
• Sombor (51471)
• Sonta (4992)
• Sopot (367)
• Sopot (1752)
• Sopotnica (248)
• Sopotnica (136)
• Sot (791)
• Sovač (133)
• Sovljak (618)
• Sovljak (1933)
• Sočica (170)
• Sočice (269)
• Spance (222)
• Spančevac (533)
• Sponce (179)
• Srbobran (13091)
• Srbovo (502)
• Srednja Dobrinja (481)
• Srednja Tušimlja (40)
• Srednjevo (530)
• Srednji Bučumet (207)
• Srednji Del (90)
• Srednji Salaš (172)
• Srednji Statovac (38)
• Sredor (260)
• Sremska Kamenica (11205)
• Sremska Mitrovica (39084)
• Sremska Rača (773)
• Sremski Karlovci (8839)
• Sremski Mihaljevci (837)
• Srezojevci (424)
• Srezovac (238)
• Srećkovac (162)
• Srndalje (66)
• Srneći Dol (58)
• Srnje (912)
• Srpce (151)
• Srpska Crnja (4383)
• Srpska Kuća (284)
• Srpski Itebej (2405)
• Srpski Krstur (1620)
• Srpski Miletić (3538)
• Stajićevo (1999)
• Stajkovce (140)
• Stajkovce (1603)
• Stalać (1828)
• Stamnica (1424)
• Stance (113)
• Stanci (241)
• Stanci (417)
• Stanevce (68)
• Stanina Reka (421)
• Staničenje (609)
• Stanišinci (391)
• Stanišić (4808)
• Stanjevo (1244)
• Stanjinac (95)
• Stanuloviće (55)
• Stanča (91)
• Stančići (348)
• Stapar (223)
• Stapar (3720)
• Stapari (974)
• Stara Banja (91)
• Stara Bingula (190)
• Stara Božurna (358)
• Stara Brezovica (89)
• Stara Moravica (5699)
• Stara Pazova (18645)
• Starac (260)
• Starci (53)
• Stari Banovci (5488)
• Stari Bračin (371)
• Stari Glog (44)
• Stari Lec (1094)
• Stari Ledinci (823)
• Stari Slankamen (674)
• Stari Trstenik (733)
• Stari Đurovac (15)
• Stari Žednik (2230)
• Staro Korito (51)
• Staro Lanište (560)
• Staro Momčilovo (216)
• Staro Selo (76)
• Staro Selo (29)
• Staro Selo (3022)
• Starčeviće (194)
• Starčevo (585)
• Starčevo  (7615)
• Stave (450)
• Stejanovci (1020)
• Stenjevac (737)
• Stepanje (486)
• Stepanovićevo (2214)
• Stepojevac (3019)
• Sterijino (234)
• Stogazovac (132)
• Stojačak (419)
• Stojići (159)
• Stojnik (1486)
• Stojnik (642)
• Stol (347)
• Stopanja (1325)
• Stradovo (19)
• Stragari (664)
• Stragari (967)
• Strajiniće (29)
• Stranjevo (48)
• Straža (1018)
• Straža (693)
• Strelac (392)
• Strezimirovci (53)
• Strezovce (995)
• Strešak (119)
• Striža  (1937)
• Strižilo (479)
• Strmac (181)
• Strmac (296)
• Strmenica (194)
• Strmna Gora (166)
• Strmosten (902)
• Strmovo (582)
• Strmovo (358)
• Strmovo (324)
• Strojinci (493)
• Strojkovce (1344)
• Stropsko (186)
• Struganica (21)
• Struganik (276)
• Strumce (46)
• Stubal (615)
• Stubal (396)
• Stubal (1314)
• Stubal (1113)
• Stubica  (1784)
• Stubica (269)
• Stubla (923)
• Stubla (119)
• Stublca (210)
• Stublenica (999)
• Stublina (158)
• Stubline (3099)
• Stublo (214)
• Stubo (282)
• Studena (200)
• Studena (117)
• Studenac (241)
• Stup (193)
• Stupnica (402)
• Stupnica (941)
• Stupčevići (952)
• Subjel (219)
• Subotica (715)
• Subotica (289)
• Subotica (757)
• Subotica (99981)
• Subotinac (1061)
• Subotište (942)
• Sudimlja (50)
• Sudsko Selo (87)
• Sugubine (183)
• Suharno (309)
• Suhi Dol (69)
• Sukovo (728)
• Sumorovac (133)
• Sumrakovac (642)
• Supnje (3525)
• Supovac  (374)
• Supska (1434)
• Suračevo (444)
• Surduk (1589)
• Surdul (44)
• Surdulica (10914)
• Surlica (101)
• Surčin (14292)
• Susek (1132)
• Sutjeska (1737)
• Suva Morava (859)
• Suvaja (89)
• Suvaja (367)
• Suvaja (149)
• Suvi Do  (935)
• Suvi Do (389)
• Suvi Do (401)
• Suvi Do (1320)
• Suvi Dol (576)
• Suvo Selo (404)
• Suvodanje (578)
• Suvodol (849)
• Suvojnica (926)
• Suševlje (228)
• Sušica (878)
• Sušica (25)
• Sušica (301)
• Sveta Petka (334)
• Svetićevo (205)
• Svetlić (417)
• Svetozar Miletić (3169)
• Sveštica (1258)
• Svilajnac (9395)
• Svileuva (1807)
• Svilojevo (1364)
• Sviloš (362)
• Svinjarevo (213)
• Svinjarica (137)
• Svinjište (41)
• Svinjište (103)
• Svirce (436)
• Svirce (501)
• Svojnovo  (1386)
• Svođe (433)
• Svračkovci (491)
• Svračkovo (222)
• Svrljig (7705)
• Svrljiška Topla (112)

Š
Šabac (55163)
• Šainovac (216)
• Šajince (90)
• Šajinovac (955)
• Šajkaš (4550)
• Šalinac (985)
• Šaludovac  (360)
• Šanac (1153)
• Šantarovac (453)
• Šapine (1064)
• Šaprance (83)
• Šarani (344)
• Šarbane (545)
• Šarbanovac (1836)
• Šarbanovac (25)
• Šarbanovac (514)
• Šarce (88)
• Šare (250)
• Šarenik (555)
• Šarkamen (374)
• Šarlince (906)
• Šarlince (854)
• Šaronje (398)
• Šaronje (231)
• Šatra (33)
• Šatrinci (399)
• Šavac  (533)
• Šavci (247)
• Šavrane (706)
• Šašilovac (385)
• Šašinci (1830)
• Šebet (79)
• Šepšin (855)
• Šesti Gabar (173)
• Šetka (471)
• Šetonje (1585)
• Ševarice (1308)
• Ševica (809)
• Ševiš (23)
• Ševrljuge (334)
• Šid (16311)
• Šiljakovac (620)
• Šiljomana (110)
• Šilopaj (135)
• Šilovo (521)
• Šimanovci (3358)
• Šipačina (252)
• Šipikovo (511)
• Šipče (74)
• Široka Planina (119)
• Široke Njive (48)
• Šišatovac (218)
• Šišave (1125)
• Šišince (639)
• Šišmanovac (95)
• Šljivar (329)
• Šljivica (157)
• Šljivova (849)
• Šljivovac (493)
• Šljivovac (123)
• Šljivovica (573)
• Šljivovik (263)
• Šljivovik (41)
• Šljivovo (379)
• Šogolj (166)
• Šopić (2230)
• Šošiće (109)
• Špaj (81)
• Špiljani (223)
• Štava (176)
• Štavalj (312)
• Štavica (427)
• Štipina (531)
• Štitar (2285)
• Štitarac (61)
• Štitare (77)
• Štitare (535)
• Štitkovo (130)
• Štrbac (246)
• Štrbovac (115)
• Štubik (939)
• Štulac (370)
• Štulac (1142)
• Šugrin (95)
• Šuljam (744)
• Šuljkovac (695)
• Šuman Topla (77)
• Šumane (1515)
• Šumarak (180)
• Šumarice (544)
• Šumata Trnica (50)
• Šume (1284)
• Šume (595)
• Šupljak (1310)
• Šurice (281)
• Šurić (128)
• Šurjan (330)
• Šutci (627)
• Šuvajić (339)
• Šušara (376)
• Šušeoka (252)
• Šušnjar (322)
• Šušure (25)

T
Tabakovac (208)
• Tabanovac (955)
• Tabanović (388)
• Tabanović (1420)
• Tabanovići (137)
• Tadenje (81)
• Takovo (493)
• Takovo (979)
• Tamnič (349)
• Tamnjanica (171)
• Tanda (350)
• Taor (378)
• Taraš (1140)
• Taskovići (403)
• Tatrasnica (5)
• Tavnik (1271)
• Taševo (2061)
• Tegovište (183)
• Tegošnica (3)
• Tekeriš (370)
• Tekija (967)
• Tekija (889)
• Tekija  (1251)
• Telečka (2084)
• Telovac (44)
• Temerin (19216)
• Temska (908)
• Tenkovo (89)
• Teočin (690)
• Tepeče (195)
• Tesovište (61)
• Tečić (660)
• Tešica (1888)
• Tibužde (1243)
• Tijanje (237)
• Tijovac (77)
• Tijovac (118)
• Tiodže (158)
• Tisovica (117)
• Titel (5894)
• Tićevac (265)
• Tmava (199)
• Toba (691)
• Tobolac (485)
• Todorin Do (214)
• Todorovce (521)
• Togočevce (828)
• Tolisavac (667)
• Tolić (434)
• Tolišnica (306)
• Toljevac (570)
• Tomanj (433)
• Tomaševac (1765)
• Tometino Polje (373)
• Topla (100)
• Toplac (519)
• Topli Do (108)
• Topli Do (53)
• Topli Dol (122)
• Topola (36)
• Topola (5422)
• Topola (1363)
• Topolnica (1064)
• Topolovnik (1098)
• Toponica (68)
• Toponica (947)
• Toponica (364)
• Toponica (969)
• Toponica (329)
• Torak (2850)
• Torda (1771)
• Tornik (168)
• Tornjoš (1766)
• Totovo Selo (709)
• Tovariševo (3102)
• Tovrljane (90)
• Točilovo (156)
• Trbosilje (352)
• Trbunje (559)
• Trbušac (396)
• Trbušani (1830)
• Trbušnica (796)
• Trbušnica (1061)
• Trebinje (74)
• Trebotin (681)
• Trejak (255)
• Trećak (62)
• Trešnjevac (1868)
• Trešnjevak (24)
• Trešnjevica  (1137)
• Trešnjevica (920)
• Trešnjevica (97)
• Trgovište (1953)
• Trgovište (39)
• Trgovište (342)
• Trgovište (1864)
• Tribrode (522)
• Trijebine (397)
• Tripkova (372)
• Trlić (1020)
• Trmbas (595)
• Trmka (36)
• Trmčare (715)
• Trn (30)
• Trnava (2237)
• Trnava (694)
• Trnava (1160)
• Trnava (259)
• Trnava (463)
• Trnava (282)
• Trnava (2685)
• Trnavac (474)
• Trnavci (494)
• Trnjaci (909)
• Trnjana (157)
• Trnjane (1361)
• Trnjane (479)
• Trnjane (915)
• Trnovac (227)
• Trnovi Laz (62)
• Trnovče (708)
• Trnovče (1060)
• Trnski Odorovci (183)
• Troponje (901)
• Troskač (6)
• Trpeza (53)
• Trska (389)
• Trstena (63)
• Trstenica (917)
• Trstenik (17180)
• Trubarevac (617)
• Trubarevo (152)
• Trudelj (410)
• Trudovo (92)
• Trupale  (2109)
• Trućevac (383)
• Tršanovci (578)
• Tršić (1263)
• Tržac (241)
• Tubići (535)
• Tubravić (418)
• Tulare (166)
• Tulare (331)
• Tulari (945)
• Tuleš (496)
• Tulež (761)
• Tulovo (739)
• Tumba (44)
• Tunovo (128)
• Tupale (725)
• Tupalovce (380)
• Tupanci (158)
• Turekovac (1794)
• Turica (634)
• Turija (400)
• Turija (599)
• Turija (2562)
• Turjane (79)
• Tutin (9111)
• Tutiće (48)
• Tuzinje (204)
• Tučkovo (170)
• Tuđin  (226)
• Tvrdići (275)
• Tvrdojevac (402)

U
Ub (6018)
• Udovice (2018)
• Ugao (545)
• Ugljarevac (160)
• Ugljarevo (478)
• Ugrinovci (480)
• Ugrinovci (7199)
• Uljma (3598)
• Umčari (2880)
• Urmanica (32)
• Urovci (1540)
• Urovica (1191)
• Ursule (380)
• Ursule (326)
• Urvič (71)
• Usije (319)
• Utrine (1038)
• Uvac (18)
• Uzdin (2498)
• Uzići (514)
• Uzovnica (914)
• Uzovo (10)
• Uzveće (1103)
• Ušak (14)
• Uševce (184)
• Ušće (2040)
• Ušće (1464)
• Užice (54717)

V
Vajska (3169)
• Vajuga (563)
• Vakup (740)
• Valakonje (1378)
• Valevac (281)
• Valjevo (61035)
• Valniš (97)
• Vapa (230)
• Vapa (691)
• Varadin (105)
• Varda, Kosjerić (330)
• Varevo (501)
• Varevo (1497)
• Varna (1720)
• Varnice (154)
• Varoš (360)
• Varoš (168)
• Varvarin (1779)
• Varvarin (2198)
• Vasilj (757)
• Vasiljevac (18)
• Vasiljevići (64)
• Vatin (250)
• Vava (266)
• Vašica (1717)
• Vele Polje  (537)
• Velebit (366)
• Velereč (599)
• Velesnica (265)
• Velika Biljanica (516)
• Velika Braina (21)
• Velika Bresnica (281)
• Velika Drenova (2719)
• Velika Grabovnica (651)
• Velika Grabovnica (1452)
• Velika Greda (1374)
• Velika Ivanča (1796)
• Velika Jasikova (998)
• Velika Ježevica (481)
• Velika Kamenica (757)
• Velika Kopašnica (676)
• Velika Krsna (3253)
• Velika Kruševica (806)
• Velika Kruševica (289)
• Velika Lomnica (899)
• Velika Lukanja (17)
• Velika Marišta (292)
• Velika Plana (666)
• Velika Plana (16210)
• Velika Reka (476)
• Velika Remeta (42)
• Velika Sejanica (791)
• Velika Sugubina (284)
• Velika Vrbica (996)
• Velika Vrbnica (470)
• Velike Pčelice (673)
• Veliki Borak (1287)
• Veliki Crljeni (4580)
• Veliki Drenovac (483)
• Veliki Gaj (790)
• Veliki Izvor (2684)
• Veliki Jasenovac (370)
• Veliki Jovanovac (395)
• Veliki Krčimir (466)
• Veliki Kupci (1035)
• Veliki Popovac (1244)
• Veliki Popović (1455)
• Veliki Radinci (1617)
• Veliki Suvodol (523)
• Veliki Trnovac (6762)
• Veliki Vrtop (270)
• Veliki Šenj (350)
• Veliki Šiljegovac (2682)
• Veliko Bonjince (459)
• Veliko Crniće (611)
• Veliko Golovode (875)
• Veliko Gradište (5658)
• Veliko Krušince (109)
• Veliko Krčmare (830)
• Veliko Laole (1925)
• Veliko Orašje (2299)
• Veliko Polje (1820)
• Veliko Pupavce (79)
• Veliko Selo  (1676)
• Veliko Selo (466)
• Veliko Selo (493)
• Veliko Selo (345)
• Veliko Središte (1340)
• Veliko Trnjane (1013)
• Veliko Vojlovce (358)
• Veliševac (419)
• Velja Glava (188)
• Velje Polje (251)
• Veljkovo (206)
• Veluće (417)
• Venčac (400)
• Venčane (1576)
• Verzar (9)
• Veselinovac (240)
• Veseniće (450)
• Veskoviće (50)
• Veta (134)
• Veternik (18626)
• Vever (18)
• Vezičevo (428)
• Vidova (156)
• Vidovac (45)
• Vidovača (32)
• Vidovo (90)
• Vidrovac (822)
• Vigošte (1034)
• Vilandrica (179)
• Vilje Kolo (11)
• Viljuša (924)
• Vilovi (396)
• Vilovo (1103)
• Vina (424)
• Vina (232)
• Vinarce (3090)
• Vinci (345)
• Vinicka (474)
• Vinjište (412)
• Vinorača (799)
• Vinča (1176)
• Vinča (5819)
• Vionica (279)
• Virine (884)
• Virovac (419)
• Virovo (586)
• Visibaba (1232)
• Visoka (474)
• Visoka (158)
• Visočka Ržana (54)
• Visočka (74)
• Visočki Odorovci (135)
• Vitance (728)
• Vitanovac (72)
• Vitanovac (648)
• Vitanovac (1649)
• Vitasi (301)
• Viteževo (863)
• Vitkovac (398)
• Vitkovac (352)
• Vitkovac (831)
• Vitkoviće (30)
• Vitkovo (488)
• Vitojevci (913)
• Vitovnica (167)
• Vitoše (57)
• Vitoševac (1277)
• Vizić (349)
• Viča (81)
• Viča (1225)
• Više Selo (117)
• Višesava (1566)
• Viševac (700)
• Viševce (92)
• Višnjeva (56)
• Višnjevac (639)
• Višnjice (41)
• Višnjićevo (1899)
• Vladimirci (1879)
• Vladimirovac (4111)
• Vladičin Han (8338)
• Vladovce (50)
• Vlahinja (88)
• Vlahovo (163)
• Vlahovo (506)
• Vlajkovac (1178)
• Vlajkovci (437)
• Vlakča (671)
• Vlaole (767)
• Vlase (584)
• Vlase (417)
• Vlasenica (482)
• Vlasi (71)
• Vlasina Okruglica (163)
• Vlasina Rid (276)
• Vlasina Stojkovićeva (252)
• Vlasotince (16212)
• Vlasovo (68)
• Vlasteljice (361)
• Vlaška (372)
• Vlaška (2547)
• Vlaški Do (1161)
• Vlaški Do (1310)
• Vlaško Polje (172)
• Vlaščić (98)
• Vlkovija (17)
• Vodanj (1314)
• Vodice (230)
• Vodice (930)
• Vogance (51)
• Voganj (1614)
• Vojilovo (290)
• Vojinovac (132)
• Vojka (5012)
• Vojkovci (278)
• Vojkoviće (36)
• Vojmilovići (135)
• Vojnegovac (270)
• Vojnici (104)
• Vojnik (946)
• Vojniće (115)
• Vojska (1050)
• Vojvoda Stepa (1720)
• Vojvodinci (417)
• Voljavče (1813)
• Voljevci (719)
• Voljčince (937)
• Voluja (1123)
• Volujac (1094)
• Volujac (382)
• Voćnjak (1204)
• Vošanovac (473)
• Vragočanica (417)
• Vrandol (372)
• Vrane (775)
• Vraneša (485)
• Vraneši (1418)
• Vranić (3899)
• Vranići (515)
• Vranište (165)
• Vranjani (473)
• Vranje (55052)
• Vranjska Banja (5882)
• Vranovac (159)
• Vranovina (329)
• Vranovo (2682)
• Vranštica (75)
• Vrapce (45)
• Vrapci (49)
• Vrapča (12)
• Vrapče (58)
• Vratare (462)
• Vratarnica (570)
• Vratna  (316)
• Vraćevšnica (150)
• Vračev Gaj (1568)
• Vračević (1019)
• Vražogrnac (1340)
• Vražogrnci (297)
• Vrba (264)
• Vrba (1286)
• Vrba (196)
• Vrban (123)
• Vrbas (25907)
• Vrbeta (169)
• Vrbica (3536)
• Vrbica (313)
• Vrbica (404)
• Vrbić (578)
• Vrbnica (518)
• Vrbnica (462)
• Vrbnica (169)
• Vrbovac (161)
• Vrbovac (190)
• Vrbovac (1108)
• Vrbovac (598)
• Vrbovno (978)
• Vrbovo (99)
• Vrbovo (357)
• Vrdila (925)
• Vrdnik (3704)
• Vrelo  (287)
• Vrelo (355)
• Vrelo (141)
• Vrelo (40)
• Vrelo (1684)
• Vreoci (3210)
• Vrgudinac (152)
• Vrh (94)
• Vrhovine (552)
• Vrhpolje (985)
• Vrlane (180)
• Vrmbaje (390)
• Vrmdža (606)
• Vrnjačka Banja (9877)
• Vrnjci (2025)
• Vrnčani (383)
• Vrnčani (279)
• Vrsjenice (200)
• Vrtiglav (488)
• Vrtine (117)
• Vrtište  (1052)
• Vrtogoš (1355)
• Vrtovac (218)
• Vrutci (222)
• Vrćenovica (501)
• Vrčin (8667)
• Vršac (36623)
• Vršački Ritovi (91)
• Vrševac (82)
• Vujanovo (64)
• Vujetinci (452)
• Vujinovača (258)
• Vukanja (705)
• Vukašinovac (512)
• Vukićevica (675)
• Vukmanovac (477)
• Vukmanovo  (389)
• Vukona (262)
• Vukosavci (411)
• Vukovac (492)
• Vuković (301)
• Vukošić (748)
• Vukušica (246)
• Vus (19)
• Vučadelce (50)
• Vučak (327)
• Vučak (348)
• Vučak (1655)
• Vučevica (108)
• Vuči Del (171)
• Vučiniće (245)
• Vučić (887)
• Vučja Lokva (15)
• Vučje (3258)
• Vučkovica (769)
• Vučkovica (443)

Z
Zablaće (1226)
• Zablaće (674)
• Zabojnica (462)
• Zabrdica (462)
• Zabrdnji Toci (133)
• Zabrega (247)
• Zabrega  (1211)
• Zabrežje (2663)
• Zabrnjica (205)
• Zabrđe (49)
• Zabrđe (716)
• Zabrđe (350)
• Zabrđe (50)
• Zagajica (575)
• Zaglavak (566)
• Zagorica (765)
• Zagradina (248)
• Zagrađe (493)
• Zagrađe (19)
• Zagrađe (241)
• Zagužane (339)
• Zagužanje (890)
• Zahumsko (150)
• Zajača (693)
• Zaječar (39491)
• Zaječiće (185)
• Zaklopača (2252)
• Zaklopača (971)
• Zakuta (196)
• Zalogovac (881)
• Zalug (1047)
• Zalužnje (482)
• Zamčanje (31)
• Zaostro (88)
• Zaovine (442)
• Zapadni Mojstir (505)
• Zarbince (652)
• Zarevo (71)
• Zarožje (790)
• Zarube (171)
• Zasad (109)
• Zasavica II (707)
• Zasavica I (836)
• Zaselje (482)
• Zaskovci (68)
• Zastup (128)
• Zatonje (749)
• Zaugline (348)
• Zavidince (503)
• Zavinograđe (1272)
• Zavlaka (962)
• Zbojštica (172)
• Zdravinje (898)
• Zdravinje (184)
• Zdravčići (526)
• Zebica (206)
• Zebica (35)
• Zebince (121)
• Zelenik (251)
• Zeletovo (110)
• Zeoke (796)
• Zeoke (261)
• Zimonjić (340)
• Zladovac (20)
• Zladovce (114)
• Zlakusa (694)
• Zlata (205)
• Zlatance (158)
• Zlatare (12)
• Zlatari (637)
• Zlatarić (486)
• Zlatibor (2344)
• Zlatićevo (200)
• Zlatokop (795)
• Zlatovo (549)
• Zli Dol (193)
• Zlodol (419)
• Zlokućane (217)
• Zlot (3757)
• Zloćudovo (271)
• Zmajevo (4361)
• Zminjak (1467)
• Zobnatica (309)
• Zoljevo (259)
• Zorovac (19)
• Zorunovac (179)
• Zrenjanin (79773)
• Zubetinac (191)
• Zubovac (214)
• Zuce (2024)
• Zukve (262)
• Zvezd (813)
• Zvezdan (1675)
• Zvečka (6138)
• Zvijezd (104)
• Zvizdar (536)
• Zvonce (254)

Ž
Žabalj (9598)
• Žabar (683)
• Žabare (361)
• Žabare (1016)
• Žabari (452)
• Žabari (1442)
• Žabljane (724)
• Žabren (321)
• Žagubica (2823)
• Žalica (12)
• Žaočani (391)
• Žarevo (92)
• Žarkovac (1102)
• Žbevac (804)
• Ždeglovo (695)
• Ždrelo (756)
• Žegrova (49)
• Željevo (87)
• Željine (153)
• Željuša (1394)
• Žeravino (21)
• Žerađe (151)
• Židilje (158)
• Žilinci (149)
• Žiljci (427)
• Žirovnica (830)
• Žirče (370)
• Žitište (3242)
• Žitkovac (2680)
• Žitkovica (142)
• Žitni Potok (592)
• Žitniće (536)
• Žitorađa (3543)
• Žitorađe (1339)
• Živica (300)
• Živica (728)
• Živinice (118)
• Živkovac (380)
• Živkovci (534)
• Živkovo (669)
• Žiča (3982)
• Žižavica (189)
• Žlne (161)
• Žujince (1248)
• Žukovac (114)
• Žunje (370)
• Žunje (258)
• Žunjeviće (211)
• Župa (344)
• Županjac (582)
• Županjevac (464)
• Žutice (224)
• Žuč (172)
• Žuče (151)
• Žučkovac (529)
• Žuželjica (166)

References
 Popis stanovništva, domaćinstava i Stanova 2002. Knjiga 1: Nacionalna ili etnička pripadnost po naseljima. Republika Srbija, Republički zavod za statistiku Beograd 2003.

See also
Administrative divisions of Serbia
Districts of Serbia
Municipalities and cities of Serbia
Cities and towns of Serbia
 Cities, towns and villages of Vojvodina

Settlements
 
Serbia